

484001–484100 

|-bgcolor=#fefefe
| 484001 ||  || — || January 30, 2006 || Kitt Peak || Spacewatch || — || align=right data-sort-value="0.73" | 730 m || 
|-id=002 bgcolor=#d6d6d6
| 484002 ||  || — || February 20, 2006 || Kitt Peak || Spacewatch || — || align=right | 2.4 km || 
|-id=003 bgcolor=#d6d6d6
| 484003 ||  || — || December 25, 2005 || Mount Lemmon || Mount Lemmon Survey || — || align=right | 2.1 km || 
|-id=004 bgcolor=#fefefe
| 484004 ||  || — || January 23, 2006 || Kitt Peak || Spacewatch || — || align=right data-sort-value="0.55" | 550 m || 
|-id=005 bgcolor=#fefefe
| 484005 ||  || — || February 20, 2006 || Kitt Peak || Spacewatch || (5026) || align=right | 1.5 km || 
|-id=006 bgcolor=#d6d6d6
| 484006 ||  || — || February 20, 2006 || Kitt Peak || Spacewatch || — || align=right | 2.5 km || 
|-id=007 bgcolor=#d6d6d6
| 484007 ||  || — || February 20, 2006 || Mount Lemmon || Mount Lemmon Survey || THB || align=right | 2.7 km || 
|-id=008 bgcolor=#d6d6d6
| 484008 ||  || — || February 2, 2006 || Kitt Peak || Spacewatch || — || align=right | 2.6 km || 
|-id=009 bgcolor=#E9E9E9
| 484009 ||  || — || February 20, 2006 || Kitt Peak || Spacewatch || — || align=right | 1.8 km || 
|-id=010 bgcolor=#d6d6d6
| 484010 ||  || — || February 6, 2006 || Catalina || CSS || — || align=right | 3.8 km || 
|-id=011 bgcolor=#d6d6d6
| 484011 ||  || — || January 26, 2006 || Kitt Peak || Spacewatch || — || align=right | 2.7 km || 
|-id=012 bgcolor=#d6d6d6
| 484012 ||  || — || January 7, 2006 || Mount Lemmon || Mount Lemmon Survey || VER || align=right | 2.8 km || 
|-id=013 bgcolor=#fefefe
| 484013 ||  || — || February 24, 2006 || Kitt Peak || Spacewatch || — || align=right data-sort-value="0.64" | 640 m || 
|-id=014 bgcolor=#fefefe
| 484014 ||  || — || January 31, 2006 || Catalina || CSS || H || align=right data-sort-value="0.78" | 780 m || 
|-id=015 bgcolor=#d6d6d6
| 484015 ||  || — || January 23, 2006 || Kitt Peak || Spacewatch || — || align=right | 2.4 km || 
|-id=016 bgcolor=#d6d6d6
| 484016 ||  || — || January 26, 2006 || Mount Lemmon || Mount Lemmon Survey || — || align=right | 2.2 km || 
|-id=017 bgcolor=#fefefe
| 484017 ||  || — || February 25, 2006 || Mount Lemmon || Mount Lemmon Survey || — || align=right data-sort-value="0.86" | 860 m || 
|-id=018 bgcolor=#fefefe
| 484018 ||  || — || February 25, 2006 || Kitt Peak || Spacewatch || — || align=right data-sort-value="0.70" | 700 m || 
|-id=019 bgcolor=#d6d6d6
| 484019 ||  || — || February 25, 2006 || Kitt Peak || Spacewatch || — || align=right | 3.1 km || 
|-id=020 bgcolor=#fefefe
| 484020 ||  || — || February 27, 2006 || Kitt Peak || Spacewatch || — || align=right data-sort-value="0.75" | 750 m || 
|-id=021 bgcolor=#fefefe
| 484021 ||  || — || February 25, 2006 || Kitt Peak || Spacewatch || NYS || align=right data-sort-value="0.63" | 630 m || 
|-id=022 bgcolor=#d6d6d6
| 484022 ||  || — || February 25, 2006 || Kitt Peak || Spacewatch || EOS || align=right | 1.8 km || 
|-id=023 bgcolor=#d6d6d6
| 484023 ||  || — || February 25, 2006 || Kitt Peak || Spacewatch || LIX || align=right | 3.2 km || 
|-id=024 bgcolor=#fefefe
| 484024 ||  || — || February 25, 2006 || Kitt Peak || Spacewatch || CLA || align=right | 1.4 km || 
|-id=025 bgcolor=#d6d6d6
| 484025 ||  || — || February 25, 2006 || Mount Lemmon || Mount Lemmon Survey || — || align=right | 2.7 km || 
|-id=026 bgcolor=#d6d6d6
| 484026 ||  || — || February 27, 2006 || Kitt Peak || Spacewatch || — || align=right | 2.6 km || 
|-id=027 bgcolor=#d6d6d6
| 484027 ||  || — || January 26, 2006 || Mount Lemmon || Mount Lemmon Survey || — || align=right | 2.8 km || 
|-id=028 bgcolor=#fefefe
| 484028 ||  || — || February 27, 2006 || Mount Lemmon || Mount Lemmon Survey || MAS || align=right data-sort-value="0.65" | 650 m || 
|-id=029 bgcolor=#d6d6d6
| 484029 ||  || — || January 31, 2006 || Kitt Peak || Spacewatch || — || align=right | 3.5 km || 
|-id=030 bgcolor=#d6d6d6
| 484030 ||  || — || December 5, 2005 || Kitt Peak || Spacewatch || Tj (2.95) || align=right | 3.1 km || 
|-id=031 bgcolor=#d6d6d6
| 484031 ||  || — || February 1, 2006 || Kitt Peak || Spacewatch || — || align=right | 3.4 km || 
|-id=032 bgcolor=#fefefe
| 484032 ||  || — || January 26, 2006 || Mount Lemmon || Mount Lemmon Survey || V || align=right data-sort-value="0.60" | 600 m || 
|-id=033 bgcolor=#fefefe
| 484033 ||  || — || February 25, 2006 || Mount Lemmon || Mount Lemmon Survey || NYS || align=right data-sort-value="0.51" | 510 m || 
|-id=034 bgcolor=#d6d6d6
| 484034 ||  || — || February 27, 2006 || Kitt Peak || Spacewatch || — || align=right | 2.3 km || 
|-id=035 bgcolor=#d6d6d6
| 484035 ||  || — || February 25, 2006 || Kitt Peak || Spacewatch || — || align=right | 2.3 km || 
|-id=036 bgcolor=#d6d6d6
| 484036 ||  || — || February 27, 2006 || Kitt Peak || Spacewatch || VER || align=right | 2.2 km || 
|-id=037 bgcolor=#fefefe
| 484037 ||  || — || March 2, 2006 || Kitt Peak || Spacewatch || — || align=right data-sort-value="0.81" | 810 m || 
|-id=038 bgcolor=#d6d6d6
| 484038 ||  || — || March 3, 2006 || Kitt Peak || Spacewatch || — || align=right | 2.3 km || 
|-id=039 bgcolor=#C2FFFF
| 484039 ||  || — || January 26, 2006 || Kitt Peak || Spacewatch || L5 || align=right | 8.5 km || 
|-id=040 bgcolor=#d6d6d6
| 484040 ||  || — || February 2, 2006 || Kitt Peak || Spacewatch || — || align=right | 3.2 km || 
|-id=041 bgcolor=#d6d6d6
| 484041 ||  || — || March 3, 2006 || Catalina || CSS || — || align=right | 3.0 km || 
|-id=042 bgcolor=#d6d6d6
| 484042 ||  || — || March 3, 2006 || Mount Lemmon || Mount Lemmon Survey || THM || align=right | 1.9 km || 
|-id=043 bgcolor=#C2FFFF
| 484043 ||  || — || March 4, 2006 || Kitt Peak || Spacewatch || L5 || align=right | 10 km || 
|-id=044 bgcolor=#d6d6d6
| 484044 ||  || — || February 2, 2006 || Kitt Peak || Spacewatch || — || align=right | 2.3 km || 
|-id=045 bgcolor=#fefefe
| 484045 ||  || — || February 25, 2006 || Mount Lemmon || Mount Lemmon Survey || — || align=right data-sort-value="0.67" | 670 m || 
|-id=046 bgcolor=#d6d6d6
| 484046 ||  || — || March 23, 2006 || Mount Lemmon || Mount Lemmon Survey || — || align=right | 4.5 km || 
|-id=047 bgcolor=#fefefe
| 484047 ||  || — || March 26, 2006 || Mount Lemmon || Mount Lemmon Survey || — || align=right data-sort-value="0.62" | 620 m || 
|-id=048 bgcolor=#fefefe
| 484048 ||  || — || March 24, 2006 || Anderson Mesa || LONEOS || — || align=right | 1.9 km || 
|-id=049 bgcolor=#fefefe
| 484049 ||  || — || March 26, 2006 || Kitt Peak || Spacewatch || MAS || align=right data-sort-value="0.69" | 690 m || 
|-id=050 bgcolor=#fefefe
| 484050 ||  || — || March 23, 2006 || Kitt Peak || Spacewatch || MAS || align=right data-sort-value="0.72" | 720 m || 
|-id=051 bgcolor=#d6d6d6
| 484051 ||  || — || April 2, 2006 || Kitt Peak || Spacewatch || Tj (2.99) || align=right | 4.6 km || 
|-id=052 bgcolor=#fefefe
| 484052 ||  || — || April 2, 2006 || Kitt Peak || Spacewatch || MAS || align=right data-sort-value="0.71" | 710 m || 
|-id=053 bgcolor=#d6d6d6
| 484053 ||  || — || April 7, 2006 || Catalina || CSS || — || align=right | 2.9 km || 
|-id=054 bgcolor=#d6d6d6
| 484054 ||  || — || February 2, 2006 || Mount Lemmon || Mount Lemmon Survey || — || align=right | 3.3 km || 
|-id=055 bgcolor=#d6d6d6
| 484055 ||  || — || April 7, 2006 || Mount Lemmon || Mount Lemmon Survey || — || align=right | 2.9 km || 
|-id=056 bgcolor=#fefefe
| 484056 ||  || — || March 23, 2006 || Mount Lemmon || Mount Lemmon Survey || — || align=right data-sort-value="0.80" | 800 m || 
|-id=057 bgcolor=#fefefe
| 484057 ||  || — || April 9, 2006 || Kitt Peak || Spacewatch || MAS || align=right data-sort-value="0.71" | 710 m || 
|-id=058 bgcolor=#fefefe
| 484058 ||  || — || April 2, 2006 || Kitt Peak || Spacewatch || — || align=right data-sort-value="0.80" | 800 m || 
|-id=059 bgcolor=#fefefe
| 484059 ||  || — || April 8, 2006 || Kitt Peak || Spacewatch || NYS || align=right data-sort-value="0.63" | 630 m || 
|-id=060 bgcolor=#fefefe
| 484060 ||  || — || April 18, 2006 || Anderson Mesa || LONEOS || — || align=right data-sort-value="0.80" | 800 m || 
|-id=061 bgcolor=#fefefe
| 484061 ||  || — || April 19, 2006 || Kitt Peak || Spacewatch || — || align=right | 1.1 km || 
|-id=062 bgcolor=#d6d6d6
| 484062 ||  || — || April 19, 2006 || Mount Lemmon || Mount Lemmon Survey || LIX || align=right | 3.5 km || 
|-id=063 bgcolor=#d6d6d6
| 484063 ||  || — || March 24, 2006 || Kitt Peak || Spacewatch || Tj (2.98) || align=right | 4.0 km || 
|-id=064 bgcolor=#d6d6d6
| 484064 ||  || — || April 24, 2006 || Kitt Peak || Spacewatch || — || align=right | 2.9 km || 
|-id=065 bgcolor=#d6d6d6
| 484065 ||  || — || March 2, 2006 || Mount Lemmon || Mount Lemmon Survey || — || align=right | 3.1 km || 
|-id=066 bgcolor=#fefefe
| 484066 ||  || — || April 26, 2006 || Kitt Peak || Spacewatch || MAS || align=right data-sort-value="0.67" | 670 m || 
|-id=067 bgcolor=#fefefe
| 484067 ||  || — || April 29, 2006 || Kitt Peak || Spacewatch || — || align=right data-sort-value="0.74" | 740 m || 
|-id=068 bgcolor=#fefefe
| 484068 ||  || — || April 19, 2006 || Mount Lemmon || Mount Lemmon Survey || — || align=right data-sort-value="0.94" | 940 m || 
|-id=069 bgcolor=#d6d6d6
| 484069 ||  || — || May 1, 2006 || Kitt Peak || Spacewatch || THM || align=right | 2.1 km || 
|-id=070 bgcolor=#fefefe
| 484070 ||  || — || April 8, 2006 || Kitt Peak || Spacewatch || — || align=right data-sort-value="0.66" | 660 m || 
|-id=071 bgcolor=#fefefe
| 484071 ||  || — || May 6, 2006 || Mount Lemmon || Mount Lemmon Survey || NYS || align=right data-sort-value="0.64" | 640 m || 
|-id=072 bgcolor=#d6d6d6
| 484072 ||  || — || May 20, 2006 || Kitt Peak || Spacewatch || — || align=right | 3.1 km || 
|-id=073 bgcolor=#fefefe
| 484073 ||  || — || May 20, 2006 || Anderson Mesa || LONEOS || — || align=right data-sort-value="0.91" | 910 m || 
|-id=074 bgcolor=#d6d6d6
| 484074 ||  || — || May 21, 2006 || Anderson Mesa || LONEOS || Tj (2.96) || align=right | 3.1 km || 
|-id=075 bgcolor=#d6d6d6
| 484075 ||  || — || May 8, 2006 || Mount Lemmon || Mount Lemmon Survey || Tj (2.99) || align=right | 4.0 km || 
|-id=076 bgcolor=#fefefe
| 484076 ||  || — || May 8, 2006 || Kitt Peak || Spacewatch || NYS || align=right data-sort-value="0.59" | 590 m || 
|-id=077 bgcolor=#d6d6d6
| 484077 ||  || — || May 24, 2006 || Catalina || CSS || 7:4* || align=right | 3.9 km || 
|-id=078 bgcolor=#d6d6d6
| 484078 ||  || — || May 24, 2006 || Mount Lemmon || Mount Lemmon Survey || — || align=right | 2.4 km || 
|-id=079 bgcolor=#d6d6d6
| 484079 ||  || — || May 21, 2006 || Kitt Peak || Spacewatch || — || align=right | 2.8 km || 
|-id=080 bgcolor=#fefefe
| 484080 ||  || — || April 7, 2006 || Kitt Peak || Spacewatch || — || align=right data-sort-value="0.78" | 780 m || 
|-id=081 bgcolor=#E9E9E9
| 484081 ||  || — || July 21, 2006 || Catalina || CSS || — || align=right | 1.5 km || 
|-id=082 bgcolor=#E9E9E9
| 484082 ||  || — || August 15, 2006 || Palomar || NEAT || — || align=right | 2.0 km || 
|-id=083 bgcolor=#E9E9E9
| 484083 ||  || — || August 15, 2006 || Palomar || NEAT || — || align=right | 2.1 km || 
|-id=084 bgcolor=#E9E9E9
| 484084 ||  || — || August 16, 2006 || Siding Spring || SSS || — || align=right | 2.5 km || 
|-id=085 bgcolor=#E9E9E9
| 484085 ||  || — || August 18, 2006 || Reedy Creek || J. Broughton || — || align=right | 2.5 km || 
|-id=086 bgcolor=#E9E9E9
| 484086 ||  || — || August 17, 2006 || Palomar || NEAT || EUN || align=right | 1.2 km || 
|-id=087 bgcolor=#E9E9E9
| 484087 ||  || — || August 18, 2006 || Anderson Mesa || LONEOS || — || align=right | 1.9 km || 
|-id=088 bgcolor=#E9E9E9
| 484088 ||  || — || August 19, 2006 || Kitt Peak || Spacewatch || — || align=right | 1.6 km || 
|-id=089 bgcolor=#E9E9E9
| 484089 ||  || — || August 21, 2006 || Palomar || NEAT || — || align=right | 1.3 km || 
|-id=090 bgcolor=#E9E9E9
| 484090 ||  || — || August 21, 2006 || Kitt Peak || Spacewatch || — || align=right | 1.5 km || 
|-id=091 bgcolor=#E9E9E9
| 484091 ||  || — || August 27, 2006 || Anderson Mesa || LONEOS || — || align=right | 1.4 km || 
|-id=092 bgcolor=#E9E9E9
| 484092 ||  || — || August 29, 2006 || Catalina || CSS || — || align=right | 1.9 km || 
|-id=093 bgcolor=#E9E9E9
| 484093 ||  || — || August 30, 2006 || Anderson Mesa || LONEOS || — || align=right | 2.5 km || 
|-id=094 bgcolor=#E9E9E9
| 484094 ||  || — || August 29, 2006 || Catalina || CSS || — || align=right | 1.4 km || 
|-id=095 bgcolor=#FA8072
| 484095 ||  || — || September 15, 2006 || Socorro || LINEAR || — || align=right | 2.2 km || 
|-id=096 bgcolor=#FA8072
| 484096 ||  || — || September 14, 2006 || Catalina || CSS || — || align=right data-sort-value="0.75" | 750 m || 
|-id=097 bgcolor=#E9E9E9
| 484097 ||  || — || September 14, 2006 || Kitt Peak || Spacewatch || EUN || align=right | 1.2 km || 
|-id=098 bgcolor=#E9E9E9
| 484098 ||  || — || September 15, 2006 || Kitt Peak || Spacewatch || — || align=right | 1.9 km || 
|-id=099 bgcolor=#E9E9E9
| 484099 ||  || — || September 15, 2006 || Kitt Peak || Spacewatch || — || align=right | 1.8 km || 
|-id=100 bgcolor=#E9E9E9
| 484100 ||  || — || September 15, 2006 || Kitt Peak || Spacewatch || NEM || align=right | 1.9 km || 
|}

484101–484200 

|-bgcolor=#E9E9E9
| 484101 ||  || — || September 15, 2006 || Kitt Peak || Spacewatch || — || align=right | 1.7 km || 
|-id=102 bgcolor=#E9E9E9
| 484102 ||  || — || September 15, 2006 || Kitt Peak || Spacewatch || EUN || align=right | 1.2 km || 
|-id=103 bgcolor=#E9E9E9
| 484103 ||  || — || July 21, 2006 || Mount Lemmon || Mount Lemmon Survey || — || align=right | 2.2 km || 
|-id=104 bgcolor=#E9E9E9
| 484104 ||  || — || September 14, 2006 || Mauna Kea || J. Masiero || — || align=right | 1.4 km || 
|-id=105 bgcolor=#E9E9E9
| 484105 ||  || — || August 28, 2006 || Kitt Peak || Spacewatch || — || align=right | 1.5 km || 
|-id=106 bgcolor=#E9E9E9
| 484106 ||  || — || September 16, 2006 || Catalina || CSS || — || align=right | 1.7 km || 
|-id=107 bgcolor=#E9E9E9
| 484107 ||  || — || September 16, 2006 || Socorro || LINEAR || — || align=right | 2.2 km || 
|-id=108 bgcolor=#E9E9E9
| 484108 ||  || — || August 18, 2006 || Kitt Peak || Spacewatch || — || align=right | 1.9 km || 
|-id=109 bgcolor=#E9E9E9
| 484109 ||  || — || August 18, 2006 || Kitt Peak || Spacewatch || — || align=right | 1.5 km || 
|-id=110 bgcolor=#E9E9E9
| 484110 ||  || — || August 27, 2006 || Kitt Peak || Spacewatch || — || align=right | 1.8 km || 
|-id=111 bgcolor=#E9E9E9
| 484111 ||  || — || September 18, 2006 || Anderson Mesa || LONEOS || — || align=right | 1.5 km || 
|-id=112 bgcolor=#E9E9E9
| 484112 ||  || — || September 18, 2006 || Catalina || CSS || — || align=right | 1.9 km || 
|-id=113 bgcolor=#E9E9E9
| 484113 ||  || — || September 19, 2006 || Kitt Peak || Spacewatch || — || align=right | 1.5 km || 
|-id=114 bgcolor=#E9E9E9
| 484114 ||  || — || September 19, 2006 || Kitt Peak || Spacewatch || — || align=right | 2.1 km || 
|-id=115 bgcolor=#E9E9E9
| 484115 ||  || — || September 19, 2006 || Kitt Peak || Spacewatch || — || align=right | 1.3 km || 
|-id=116 bgcolor=#E9E9E9
| 484116 ||  || — || September 15, 2006 || Kitt Peak || Spacewatch || — || align=right | 2.0 km || 
|-id=117 bgcolor=#E9E9E9
| 484117 ||  || — || September 25, 2006 || Mount Lemmon || Mount Lemmon Survey || — || align=right | 1.6 km || 
|-id=118 bgcolor=#E9E9E9
| 484118 ||  || — || September 18, 2006 || Kitt Peak || Spacewatch || — || align=right | 1.7 km || 
|-id=119 bgcolor=#E9E9E9
| 484119 ||  || — || September 26, 2006 || Kitt Peak || Spacewatch || — || align=right | 1.2 km || 
|-id=120 bgcolor=#E9E9E9
| 484120 ||  || — || September 15, 2006 || Kitt Peak || Spacewatch || JUN || align=right | 1.1 km || 
|-id=121 bgcolor=#E9E9E9
| 484121 ||  || — || September 19, 2006 || Kitt Peak || Spacewatch || — || align=right | 1.2 km || 
|-id=122 bgcolor=#E9E9E9
| 484122 ||  || — || September 15, 2006 || Kitt Peak || Spacewatch || — || align=right | 1.7 km || 
|-id=123 bgcolor=#E9E9E9
| 484123 ||  || — || September 26, 2006 || Kitt Peak || Spacewatch || — || align=right | 1.7 km || 
|-id=124 bgcolor=#E9E9E9
| 484124 ||  || — || September 26, 2006 || Kitt Peak || Spacewatch || — || align=right | 2.0 km || 
|-id=125 bgcolor=#E9E9E9
| 484125 ||  || — || September 19, 2006 || Catalina || CSS || — || align=right | 1.6 km || 
|-id=126 bgcolor=#E9E9E9
| 484126 ||  || — || September 17, 2006 || Catalina || CSS || — || align=right | 1.4 km || 
|-id=127 bgcolor=#E9E9E9
| 484127 ||  || — || September 25, 2006 || Kitt Peak || Spacewatch || — || align=right | 1.3 km || 
|-id=128 bgcolor=#E9E9E9
| 484128 ||  || — || September 14, 2006 || Kitt Peak || Spacewatch || — || align=right | 1.4 km || 
|-id=129 bgcolor=#E9E9E9
| 484129 ||  || — || September 27, 2006 || Kitt Peak || Spacewatch || MRX || align=right data-sort-value="0.88" | 880 m || 
|-id=130 bgcolor=#E9E9E9
| 484130 ||  || — || September 27, 2006 || Kitt Peak || Spacewatch || — || align=right | 2.1 km || 
|-id=131 bgcolor=#fefefe
| 484131 ||  || — || September 27, 2006 || Kitt Peak || Spacewatch || — || align=right data-sort-value="0.59" | 590 m || 
|-id=132 bgcolor=#E9E9E9
| 484132 ||  || — || September 19, 2006 || Kitt Peak || Spacewatch || — || align=right | 1.6 km || 
|-id=133 bgcolor=#E9E9E9
| 484133 ||  || — || September 15, 2006 || Kitt Peak || Spacewatch || MRX || align=right data-sort-value="0.79" | 790 m || 
|-id=134 bgcolor=#E9E9E9
| 484134 ||  || — || September 30, 2006 || Catalina || CSS || — || align=right | 1.7 km || 
|-id=135 bgcolor=#E9E9E9
| 484135 ||  || — || September 18, 2006 || Apache Point || A. C. Becker || MAR || align=right data-sort-value="0.91" | 910 m || 
|-id=136 bgcolor=#E9E9E9
| 484136 ||  || — || September 18, 2006 || Kitt Peak || Spacewatch || — || align=right | 1.7 km || 
|-id=137 bgcolor=#d6d6d6
| 484137 ||  || — || September 28, 2006 || Mount Lemmon || Mount Lemmon Survey || — || align=right | 2.3 km || 
|-id=138 bgcolor=#E9E9E9
| 484138 ||  || — || September 28, 2006 || Mount Lemmon || Mount Lemmon Survey || MRX || align=right data-sort-value="0.75" | 750 m || 
|-id=139 bgcolor=#E9E9E9
| 484139 ||  || — || September 30, 2006 || Mount Lemmon || Mount Lemmon Survey || — || align=right | 1.5 km || 
|-id=140 bgcolor=#fefefe
| 484140 ||  || — || October 2, 2006 || Mount Lemmon || Mount Lemmon Survey || — || align=right data-sort-value="0.59" | 590 m || 
|-id=141 bgcolor=#E9E9E9
| 484141 ||  || — || September 24, 2006 || Kitt Peak || Spacewatch || — || align=right | 1.5 km || 
|-id=142 bgcolor=#E9E9E9
| 484142 ||  || — || September 30, 2006 || Mount Lemmon || Mount Lemmon Survey || — || align=right | 1.9 km || 
|-id=143 bgcolor=#fefefe
| 484143 ||  || — || September 25, 2006 || Mount Lemmon || Mount Lemmon Survey || — || align=right data-sort-value="0.75" | 750 m || 
|-id=144 bgcolor=#E9E9E9
| 484144 ||  || — || October 12, 2006 || Kitt Peak || Spacewatch || — || align=right | 2.0 km || 
|-id=145 bgcolor=#E9E9E9
| 484145 ||  || — || September 25, 2006 || Mount Lemmon || Mount Lemmon Survey || — || align=right | 1.5 km || 
|-id=146 bgcolor=#E9E9E9
| 484146 ||  || — || October 4, 2006 || Mount Lemmon || Mount Lemmon Survey || DOR || align=right | 1.8 km || 
|-id=147 bgcolor=#E9E9E9
| 484147 ||  || — || October 11, 2006 || Kitt Peak || Spacewatch || — || align=right | 1.7 km || 
|-id=148 bgcolor=#E9E9E9
| 484148 ||  || — || September 30, 2006 || Catalina || CSS || — || align=right | 2.3 km || 
|-id=149 bgcolor=#E9E9E9
| 484149 ||  || — || October 4, 2006 || Mount Lemmon || Mount Lemmon Survey || DOR || align=right | 1.9 km || 
|-id=150 bgcolor=#E9E9E9
| 484150 ||  || — || October 12, 2006 || Kitt Peak || Spacewatch || AGN || align=right | 1.0 km || 
|-id=151 bgcolor=#E9E9E9
| 484151 ||  || — || October 2, 2006 || Mount Lemmon || Mount Lemmon Survey || — || align=right | 1.8 km || 
|-id=152 bgcolor=#E9E9E9
| 484152 ||  || — || October 13, 2006 || Kitt Peak || Spacewatch || — || align=right | 1.6 km || 
|-id=153 bgcolor=#E9E9E9
| 484153 ||  || — || October 16, 2006 || Kitt Peak || Spacewatch || — || align=right | 1.9 km || 
|-id=154 bgcolor=#E9E9E9
| 484154 ||  || — || October 2, 2006 || Mount Lemmon || Mount Lemmon Survey || — || align=right | 2.2 km || 
|-id=155 bgcolor=#E9E9E9
| 484155 ||  || — || September 25, 2006 || Mount Lemmon || Mount Lemmon Survey || — || align=right | 2.3 km || 
|-id=156 bgcolor=#d6d6d6
| 484156 ||  || — || October 16, 2006 || Kitt Peak || Spacewatch || — || align=right | 2.7 km || 
|-id=157 bgcolor=#E9E9E9
| 484157 ||  || — || October 16, 2006 || Kitt Peak || Spacewatch || GEF || align=right data-sort-value="0.90" | 900 m || 
|-id=158 bgcolor=#E9E9E9
| 484158 ||  || — || September 30, 2006 || Mount Lemmon || Mount Lemmon Survey || — || align=right | 2.2 km || 
|-id=159 bgcolor=#E9E9E9
| 484159 ||  || — || September 25, 2006 || Mount Lemmon || Mount Lemmon Survey || HOF || align=right | 2.3 km || 
|-id=160 bgcolor=#E9E9E9
| 484160 ||  || — || October 16, 2006 || Kitt Peak || Spacewatch || — || align=right | 1.7 km || 
|-id=161 bgcolor=#E9E9E9
| 484161 ||  || — || October 23, 2006 || Eskridge || Farpoint Obs. || — || align=right | 1.7 km || 
|-id=162 bgcolor=#E9E9E9
| 484162 ||  || — || August 27, 2006 || Kitt Peak || Spacewatch || — || align=right | 2.1 km || 
|-id=163 bgcolor=#E9E9E9
| 484163 ||  || — || October 3, 2006 || Mount Lemmon || Mount Lemmon Survey || — || align=right | 1.6 km || 
|-id=164 bgcolor=#E9E9E9
| 484164 ||  || — || October 19, 2006 || Kitt Peak || Spacewatch || — || align=right | 1.9 km || 
|-id=165 bgcolor=#E9E9E9
| 484165 ||  || — || October 4, 2006 || Mount Lemmon || Mount Lemmon Survey || — || align=right | 2.0 km || 
|-id=166 bgcolor=#E9E9E9
| 484166 ||  || — || October 19, 2006 || Kitt Peak || Spacewatch || — || align=right | 1.9 km || 
|-id=167 bgcolor=#E9E9E9
| 484167 ||  || — || October 19, 2006 || Palomar || NEAT || JUN || align=right | 1.2 km || 
|-id=168 bgcolor=#E9E9E9
| 484168 ||  || — || October 2, 2006 || Mount Lemmon || Mount Lemmon Survey || EUN || align=right | 1.1 km || 
|-id=169 bgcolor=#E9E9E9
| 484169 ||  || — || October 3, 2006 || Mount Lemmon || Mount Lemmon Survey || HOF || align=right | 2.2 km || 
|-id=170 bgcolor=#E9E9E9
| 484170 ||  || — || September 30, 2006 || Catalina || CSS || — || align=right | 2.3 km || 
|-id=171 bgcolor=#E9E9E9
| 484171 ||  || — || September 28, 2006 || Catalina || CSS || — || align=right | 1.9 km || 
|-id=172 bgcolor=#E9E9E9
| 484172 ||  || — || September 25, 2006 || Kitt Peak || Spacewatch || — || align=right | 1.8 km || 
|-id=173 bgcolor=#E9E9E9
| 484173 ||  || — || October 3, 2006 || Mount Lemmon || Mount Lemmon Survey || — || align=right | 1.7 km || 
|-id=174 bgcolor=#E9E9E9
| 484174 ||  || — || September 28, 2006 || Kitt Peak || Spacewatch || — || align=right | 1.5 km || 
|-id=175 bgcolor=#E9E9E9
| 484175 ||  || — || September 26, 2006 || Mount Lemmon || Mount Lemmon Survey || — || align=right | 1.7 km || 
|-id=176 bgcolor=#E9E9E9
| 484176 ||  || — || October 12, 2006 || Kitt Peak || Spacewatch || — || align=right | 2.0 km || 
|-id=177 bgcolor=#E9E9E9
| 484177 ||  || — || October 28, 2006 || Mount Lemmon || Mount Lemmon Survey || — || align=right | 1.9 km || 
|-id=178 bgcolor=#fefefe
| 484178 ||  || — || October 27, 2006 || Mount Lemmon || Mount Lemmon Survey || — || align=right data-sort-value="0.61" | 610 m || 
|-id=179 bgcolor=#E9E9E9
| 484179 ||  || — || September 27, 2006 || Mount Lemmon || Mount Lemmon Survey || — || align=right | 1.8 km || 
|-id=180 bgcolor=#fefefe
| 484180 ||  || — || October 28, 2006 || Kitt Peak || Spacewatch || — || align=right data-sort-value="0.57" | 570 m || 
|-id=181 bgcolor=#E9E9E9
| 484181 ||  || — || October 2, 2006 || Mount Lemmon || Mount Lemmon Survey || — || align=right | 2.1 km || 
|-id=182 bgcolor=#E9E9E9
| 484182 ||  || — || October 16, 2006 || Kitt Peak || Spacewatch || — || align=right | 1.7 km || 
|-id=183 bgcolor=#E9E9E9
| 484183 ||  || — || October 17, 2006 || Catalina || CSS || — || align=right | 2.2 km || 
|-id=184 bgcolor=#E9E9E9
| 484184 ||  || — || October 19, 2006 || Kitt Peak || Spacewatch || HOF || align=right | 2.2 km || 
|-id=185 bgcolor=#E9E9E9
| 484185 ||  || — || October 31, 2006 || Mount Lemmon || Mount Lemmon Survey || — || align=right | 1.9 km || 
|-id=186 bgcolor=#E9E9E9
| 484186 ||  || — || October 21, 2006 || Kitt Peak || Spacewatch || DOR || align=right | 1.9 km || 
|-id=187 bgcolor=#E9E9E9
| 484187 ||  || — || October 4, 2006 || Mount Lemmon || Mount Lemmon Survey || — || align=right | 2.0 km || 
|-id=188 bgcolor=#E9E9E9
| 484188 ||  || — || November 12, 2006 || Mount Lemmon || Mount Lemmon Survey || AST || align=right | 1.5 km || 
|-id=189 bgcolor=#d6d6d6
| 484189 ||  || — || October 22, 2006 || Kitt Peak || Spacewatch || — || align=right | 1.8 km || 
|-id=190 bgcolor=#E9E9E9
| 484190 ||  || — || November 11, 2006 || Kitt Peak || Spacewatch || — || align=right | 1.6 km || 
|-id=191 bgcolor=#E9E9E9
| 484191 ||  || — || November 12, 2006 || Mount Lemmon || Mount Lemmon Survey || — || align=right | 2.1 km || 
|-id=192 bgcolor=#E9E9E9
| 484192 ||  || — || October 2, 2006 || Mount Lemmon || Mount Lemmon Survey || — || align=right | 2.5 km || 
|-id=193 bgcolor=#E9E9E9
| 484193 ||  || — || November 12, 2006 || Mount Lemmon || Mount Lemmon Survey || — || align=right | 1.9 km || 
|-id=194 bgcolor=#fefefe
| 484194 ||  || — || November 13, 2006 || Kitt Peak || Spacewatch || — || align=right data-sort-value="0.71" | 710 m || 
|-id=195 bgcolor=#E9E9E9
| 484195 ||  || — || November 15, 2006 || Kitt Peak || Spacewatch || — || align=right | 1.7 km || 
|-id=196 bgcolor=#E9E9E9
| 484196 ||  || — || September 27, 2006 || Mount Lemmon || Mount Lemmon Survey || — || align=right | 2.9 km || 
|-id=197 bgcolor=#fefefe
| 484197 ||  || — || October 23, 2006 || Mount Lemmon || Mount Lemmon Survey || — || align=right data-sort-value="0.59" | 590 m || 
|-id=198 bgcolor=#fefefe
| 484198 ||  || — || November 8, 2006 || Palomar || NEAT || — || align=right data-sort-value="0.67" | 670 m || 
|-id=199 bgcolor=#FFC2E0
| 484199 ||  || — || November 19, 2006 || Mount Lemmon || Mount Lemmon Survey || APO || align=right data-sort-value="0.39" | 390 m || 
|-id=200 bgcolor=#E9E9E9
| 484200 ||  || — || November 17, 2006 || Kitt Peak || Spacewatch || — || align=right | 1.9 km || 
|}

484201–484300 

|-bgcolor=#E9E9E9
| 484201 ||  || — || October 21, 2006 || Mount Lemmon || Mount Lemmon Survey || AEO || align=right | 1.1 km || 
|-id=202 bgcolor=#E9E9E9
| 484202 ||  || — || October 23, 2006 || Mount Lemmon || Mount Lemmon Survey || AGN || align=right data-sort-value="0.92" | 920 m || 
|-id=203 bgcolor=#E9E9E9
| 484203 ||  || — || November 24, 2006 || Mount Lemmon || Mount Lemmon Survey || — || align=right | 1.8 km || 
|-id=204 bgcolor=#E9E9E9
| 484204 ||  || — || November 20, 2006 || Catalina || CSS || — || align=right | 3.2 km || 
|-id=205 bgcolor=#E9E9E9
| 484205 ||  || — || December 12, 2006 || Mount Lemmon || Mount Lemmon Survey || WIT || align=right data-sort-value="0.79" | 790 m || 
|-id=206 bgcolor=#fefefe
| 484206 ||  || — || December 11, 2006 || Kitt Peak || Spacewatch || — || align=right data-sort-value="0.59" | 590 m || 
|-id=207 bgcolor=#d6d6d6
| 484207 ||  || — || January 9, 2007 || Kitt Peak || Spacewatch || — || align=right | 2.5 km || 
|-id=208 bgcolor=#d6d6d6
| 484208 ||  || — || December 26, 2006 || Kitt Peak || Spacewatch || — || align=right | 2.0 km || 
|-id=209 bgcolor=#fefefe
| 484209 ||  || — || January 25, 2007 || Kitt Peak || Spacewatch || — || align=right data-sort-value="0.67" | 670 m || 
|-id=210 bgcolor=#fefefe
| 484210 ||  || — || January 17, 2007 || Kitt Peak || Spacewatch || (883) || align=right data-sort-value="0.59" | 590 m || 
|-id=211 bgcolor=#E9E9E9
| 484211 ||  || — || January 17, 2007 || Kitt Peak || Spacewatch || — || align=right | 2.1 km || 
|-id=212 bgcolor=#d6d6d6
| 484212 ||  || — || October 1, 2005 || Kitt Peak || Spacewatch || KOR || align=right | 1.2 km || 
|-id=213 bgcolor=#fefefe
| 484213 ||  || — || February 6, 2007 || Mount Lemmon || Mount Lemmon Survey || — || align=right data-sort-value="0.63" | 630 m || 
|-id=214 bgcolor=#fefefe
| 484214 ||  || — || February 17, 2007 || Calvin-Rehoboth || Calvin–Rehoboth Obs. || — || align=right data-sort-value="0.54" | 540 m || 
|-id=215 bgcolor=#d6d6d6
| 484215 ||  || — || February 21, 2007 || Mount Lemmon || Mount Lemmon Survey || — || align=right | 2.7 km || 
|-id=216 bgcolor=#fefefe
| 484216 ||  || — || February 21, 2007 || Mount Lemmon || Mount Lemmon Survey || — || align=right data-sort-value="0.47" | 470 m || 
|-id=217 bgcolor=#fefefe
| 484217 ||  || — || February 21, 2007 || Kitt Peak || Spacewatch || — || align=right data-sort-value="0.57" | 570 m || 
|-id=218 bgcolor=#C2FFFF
| 484218 ||  || — || February 21, 2007 || Kitt Peak || Spacewatch || L5 || align=right | 8.0 km || 
|-id=219 bgcolor=#fefefe
| 484219 ||  || — || February 23, 2007 || Kitt Peak || Spacewatch || critical || align=right data-sort-value="0.47" | 470 m || 
|-id=220 bgcolor=#fefefe
| 484220 ||  || — || February 23, 2007 || Mount Lemmon || Mount Lemmon Survey || H || align=right data-sort-value="0.68" | 680 m || 
|-id=221 bgcolor=#fefefe
| 484221 ||  || — || February 8, 2007 || Kitt Peak || Spacewatch || — || align=right data-sort-value="0.62" | 620 m || 
|-id=222 bgcolor=#FA8072
| 484222 ||  || — || February 23, 2007 || Catalina || CSS || H || align=right data-sort-value="0.50" | 500 m || 
|-id=223 bgcolor=#FA8072
| 484223 ||  || — || February 26, 2007 || Catalina || CSS || — || align=right | 1.2 km || 
|-id=224 bgcolor=#d6d6d6
| 484224 ||  || — || February 23, 2007 || Mount Lemmon || Mount Lemmon Survey || — || align=right | 1.8 km || 
|-id=225 bgcolor=#C2FFFF
| 484225 ||  || — || February 17, 2007 || Mount Lemmon || Mount Lemmon Survey || L5 || align=right | 12 km || 
|-id=226 bgcolor=#d6d6d6
| 484226 ||  || — || February 17, 2007 || Kitt Peak || Spacewatch || — || align=right | 2.9 km || 
|-id=227 bgcolor=#d6d6d6
| 484227 ||  || — || March 9, 2007 || Kitt Peak || Spacewatch || — || align=right | 3.1 km || 
|-id=228 bgcolor=#fefefe
| 484228 ||  || — || March 12, 2007 || Mount Lemmon || Mount Lemmon Survey || H || align=right data-sort-value="0.79" | 790 m || 
|-id=229 bgcolor=#d6d6d6
| 484229 ||  || — || January 27, 2007 || Kitt Peak || Spacewatch || — || align=right | 2.5 km || 
|-id=230 bgcolor=#d6d6d6
| 484230 ||  || — || February 27, 2007 || Kitt Peak || Spacewatch || — || align=right | 2.2 km || 
|-id=231 bgcolor=#C2FFFF
| 484231 ||  || — || February 25, 2007 || Mount Lemmon || Mount Lemmon Survey || L5 || align=right | 8.5 km || 
|-id=232 bgcolor=#fefefe
| 484232 ||  || — || March 10, 2007 || Kitt Peak || Spacewatch || — || align=right | 1.3 km || 
|-id=233 bgcolor=#fefefe
| 484233 ||  || — || January 28, 2007 || Kitt Peak || Spacewatch || — || align=right data-sort-value="0.71" | 710 m || 
|-id=234 bgcolor=#d6d6d6
| 484234 ||  || — || February 23, 2007 || Mount Lemmon || Mount Lemmon Survey || — || align=right | 2.1 km || 
|-id=235 bgcolor=#d6d6d6
| 484235 ||  || — || March 12, 2007 || Kitt Peak || Spacewatch || — || align=right | 2.0 km || 
|-id=236 bgcolor=#d6d6d6
| 484236 ||  || — || February 27, 2007 || Kitt Peak || Spacewatch || — || align=right | 2.2 km || 
|-id=237 bgcolor=#d6d6d6
| 484237 ||  || — || February 26, 2007 || Mount Lemmon || Mount Lemmon Survey || — || align=right | 3.5 km || 
|-id=238 bgcolor=#fefefe
| 484238 ||  || — || March 12, 2007 || Kitt Peak || Spacewatch || — || align=right data-sort-value="0.73" | 730 m || 
|-id=239 bgcolor=#fefefe
| 484239 ||  || — || March 12, 2007 || Kitt Peak || Spacewatch || — || align=right data-sort-value="0.59" | 590 m || 
|-id=240 bgcolor=#fefefe
| 484240 ||  || — || March 14, 2007 || Kitt Peak || Spacewatch || — || align=right data-sort-value="0.71" | 710 m || 
|-id=241 bgcolor=#d6d6d6
| 484241 ||  || — || March 14, 2007 || Kitt Peak || Spacewatch || — || align=right | 2.7 km || 
|-id=242 bgcolor=#d6d6d6
| 484242 ||  || — || March 13, 2007 || Mount Lemmon || Mount Lemmon Survey || — || align=right | 2.1 km || 
|-id=243 bgcolor=#fefefe
| 484243 ||  || — || March 15, 2007 || Mount Lemmon || Mount Lemmon Survey || — || align=right data-sort-value="0.71" | 710 m || 
|-id=244 bgcolor=#fefefe
| 484244 ||  || — || February 21, 2007 || Mount Lemmon || Mount Lemmon Survey || — || align=right data-sort-value="0.71" | 710 m || 
|-id=245 bgcolor=#fefefe
| 484245 ||  || — || January 15, 2007 || Mount Lemmon || Mount Lemmon Survey || — || align=right data-sort-value="0.74" | 740 m || 
|-id=246 bgcolor=#d6d6d6
| 484246 ||  || — || February 17, 2007 || Mount Lemmon || Mount Lemmon Survey || — || align=right | 2.8 km || 
|-id=247 bgcolor=#FA8072
| 484247 ||  || — || March 19, 2007 || Catalina || CSS || — || align=right | 1.0 km || 
|-id=248 bgcolor=#d6d6d6
| 484248 ||  || — || March 20, 2007 || Anderson Mesa || LONEOS || — || align=right | 1.7 km || 
|-id=249 bgcolor=#C2FFFF
| 484249 ||  || — || March 20, 2007 || Mount Lemmon || Mount Lemmon Survey || L5 || align=right | 7.0 km || 
|-id=250 bgcolor=#d6d6d6
| 484250 ||  || — || February 23, 2007 || Mount Lemmon || Mount Lemmon Survey || — || align=right | 1.8 km || 
|-id=251 bgcolor=#d6d6d6
| 484251 ||  || — || March 25, 2007 || Mount Lemmon || Mount Lemmon Survey || — || align=right | 2.9 km || 
|-id=252 bgcolor=#d6d6d6
| 484252 ||  || — || March 26, 2007 || Kitt Peak || Spacewatch || — || align=right | 2.5 km || 
|-id=253 bgcolor=#d6d6d6
| 484253 ||  || — || March 18, 2007 || Kitt Peak || Spacewatch || — || align=right | 2.5 km || 
|-id=254 bgcolor=#C2FFFF
| 484254 ||  || — || March 16, 2007 || Mount Lemmon || Mount Lemmon Survey || L5 || align=right | 7.5 km || 
|-id=255 bgcolor=#d6d6d6
| 484255 ||  || — || April 12, 2007 || Črni Vrh || Črni Vrh || — || align=right | 2.9 km || 
|-id=256 bgcolor=#d6d6d6
| 484256 ||  || — || April 14, 2007 || Kitt Peak || Spacewatch || — || align=right | 3.6 km || 
|-id=257 bgcolor=#d6d6d6
| 484257 ||  || — || March 15, 2007 || Kitt Peak || Spacewatch || — || align=right | 2.5 km || 
|-id=258 bgcolor=#d6d6d6
| 484258 ||  || — || April 14, 2007 || Mount Lemmon || Mount Lemmon Survey || — || align=right | 2.3 km || 
|-id=259 bgcolor=#d6d6d6
| 484259 ||  || — || April 14, 2007 || Kitt Peak || Spacewatch || — || align=right | 2.8 km || 
|-id=260 bgcolor=#d6d6d6
| 484260 ||  || — || April 15, 2007 || Kitt Peak || Spacewatch || — || align=right | 2.1 km || 
|-id=261 bgcolor=#d6d6d6
| 484261 ||  || — || April 11, 2007 || Kitt Peak || Spacewatch || — || align=right | 3.9 km || 
|-id=262 bgcolor=#fefefe
| 484262 ||  || — || April 15, 2007 || Kitt Peak || Spacewatch || — || align=right data-sort-value="0.68" | 680 m || 
|-id=263 bgcolor=#fefefe
| 484263 ||  || — || April 22, 2007 || Kitt Peak || Spacewatch || — || align=right data-sort-value="0.71" | 710 m || 
|-id=264 bgcolor=#d6d6d6
| 484264 ||  || — || April 22, 2007 || Catalina || CSS || — || align=right | 3.3 km || 
|-id=265 bgcolor=#C2FFFF
| 484265 ||  || — || March 25, 2007 || Mount Lemmon || Mount Lemmon Survey || L5 || align=right | 7.8 km || 
|-id=266 bgcolor=#d6d6d6
| 484266 ||  || — || February 21, 2007 || Mount Lemmon || Mount Lemmon Survey || — || align=right | 2.3 km || 
|-id=267 bgcolor=#d6d6d6
| 484267 ||  || — || April 24, 2007 || Kitt Peak || Spacewatch || — || align=right | 2.7 km || 
|-id=268 bgcolor=#fefefe
| 484268 ||  || — || March 26, 2007 || Mount Lemmon || Mount Lemmon Survey || — || align=right data-sort-value="0.59" | 590 m || 
|-id=269 bgcolor=#FA8072
| 484269 ||  || — || April 20, 2007 || Kitt Peak || Spacewatch || — || align=right data-sort-value="0.75" | 750 m || 
|-id=270 bgcolor=#fefefe
| 484270 ||  || — || March 13, 2007 || Kitt Peak || Spacewatch || — || align=right data-sort-value="0.64" | 640 m || 
|-id=271 bgcolor=#d6d6d6
| 484271 ||  || — || January 15, 2007 || Kitt Peak || Spacewatch || — || align=right | 2.8 km || 
|-id=272 bgcolor=#fefefe
| 484272 ||  || — || April 14, 2007 || Mount Lemmon || Mount Lemmon Survey || — || align=right data-sort-value="0.73" | 730 m || 
|-id=273 bgcolor=#d6d6d6
| 484273 ||  || — || May 7, 2007 || Kitt Peak || Spacewatch || — || align=right | 3.1 km || 
|-id=274 bgcolor=#d6d6d6
| 484274 ||  || — || May 8, 2007 || Kitt Peak || Spacewatch || — || align=right | 2.4 km || 
|-id=275 bgcolor=#fefefe
| 484275 ||  || — || April 18, 2007 || Mount Lemmon || Mount Lemmon Survey || — || align=right data-sort-value="0.74" | 740 m || 
|-id=276 bgcolor=#fefefe
| 484276 ||  || — || April 25, 2007 || Kitt Peak || Spacewatch || — || align=right data-sort-value="0.78" | 780 m || 
|-id=277 bgcolor=#fefefe
| 484277 ||  || — || April 25, 2007 || Kitt Peak || Spacewatch || — || align=right data-sort-value="0.81" | 810 m || 
|-id=278 bgcolor=#fefefe
| 484278 ||  || — || April 24, 2007 || Kitt Peak || Spacewatch || — || align=right data-sort-value="0.57" | 570 m || 
|-id=279 bgcolor=#FA8072
| 484279 ||  || — || May 11, 2007 || Kitt Peak || Spacewatch || — || align=right data-sort-value="0.97" | 970 m || 
|-id=280 bgcolor=#d6d6d6
| 484280 ||  || — || June 8, 2007 || Kitt Peak || Spacewatch || — || align=right | 3.4 km || 
|-id=281 bgcolor=#fefefe
| 484281 ||  || — || May 25, 2007 || Kitt Peak || Spacewatch || — || align=right data-sort-value="0.68" | 680 m || 
|-id=282 bgcolor=#fefefe
| 484282 ||  || — || May 10, 2007 || Mount Lemmon || Mount Lemmon Survey || — || align=right data-sort-value="0.66" | 660 m || 
|-id=283 bgcolor=#fefefe
| 484283 ||  || — || August 6, 2007 || Lulin || LUSS || — || align=right data-sort-value="0.93" | 930 m || 
|-id=284 bgcolor=#FA8072
| 484284 ||  || — || August 8, 2007 || Socorro || LINEAR || — || align=right | 1.4 km || 
|-id=285 bgcolor=#fefefe
| 484285 ||  || — || August 9, 2007 || Socorro || LINEAR || — || align=right data-sort-value="0.93" | 930 m || 
|-id=286 bgcolor=#fefefe
| 484286 ||  || — || August 12, 2007 || La Sagra || OAM Obs. || — || align=right | 1.1 km || 
|-id=287 bgcolor=#d6d6d6
| 484287 ||  || — || March 5, 2006 || Kitt Peak || Spacewatch || Tj (2.96) || align=right | 3.6 km || 
|-id=288 bgcolor=#fefefe
| 484288 ||  || — || September 4, 2007 || Catalina || CSS || — || align=right | 1.0 km || 
|-id=289 bgcolor=#E9E9E9
| 484289 ||  || — || October 5, 2003 || Kitt Peak || Spacewatch || — || align=right data-sort-value="0.82" | 820 m || 
|-id=290 bgcolor=#E9E9E9
| 484290 ||  || — || September 9, 2007 || Kitt Peak || Spacewatch || — || align=right | 1.5 km || 
|-id=291 bgcolor=#fefefe
| 484291 ||  || — || September 9, 2007 || Kitt Peak || Spacewatch || — || align=right | 2.3 km || 
|-id=292 bgcolor=#fefefe
| 484292 ||  || — || August 23, 2007 || Kitt Peak || Spacewatch || — || align=right data-sort-value="0.89" | 890 m || 
|-id=293 bgcolor=#E9E9E9
| 484293 ||  || — || September 10, 2007 || Kitt Peak || Spacewatch || — || align=right data-sort-value="0.69" | 690 m || 
|-id=294 bgcolor=#fefefe
| 484294 ||  || — || September 10, 2007 || Mount Lemmon || Mount Lemmon Survey || — || align=right data-sort-value="0.78" | 780 m || 
|-id=295 bgcolor=#E9E9E9
| 484295 ||  || — || September 10, 2007 || Kitt Peak || Spacewatch || — || align=right data-sort-value="0.77" | 770 m || 
|-id=296 bgcolor=#d6d6d6
| 484296 ||  || — || September 14, 2007 || Kitt Peak || Spacewatch || 3:2critical || align=right | 3.9 km || 
|-id=297 bgcolor=#E9E9E9
| 484297 ||  || — || September 12, 2007 || Mount Lemmon || Mount Lemmon Survey || — || align=right | 1.2 km || 
|-id=298 bgcolor=#E9E9E9
| 484298 ||  || — || September 10, 2007 || Kitt Peak || Spacewatch || — || align=right data-sort-value="0.68" | 680 m || 
|-id=299 bgcolor=#E9E9E9
| 484299 ||  || — || September 2, 2007 || Catalina || CSS || — || align=right | 1.9 km || 
|-id=300 bgcolor=#E9E9E9
| 484300 ||  || — || September 5, 2007 || Catalina || CSS || — || align=right | 1.6 km || 
|}

484301–484400 

|-bgcolor=#FA8072
| 484301 ||  || — || October 4, 2007 || Kitt Peak || Spacewatch || — || align=right data-sort-value="0.48" | 480 m || 
|-id=302 bgcolor=#E9E9E9
| 484302 ||  || — || September 8, 2007 || Mount Lemmon || Mount Lemmon Survey || — || align=right | 1.1 km || 
|-id=303 bgcolor=#E9E9E9
| 484303 ||  || — || September 15, 2007 || Mount Lemmon || Mount Lemmon Survey || — || align=right | 1.7 km || 
|-id=304 bgcolor=#E9E9E9
| 484304 ||  || — || October 6, 2007 || Socorro || LINEAR || — || align=right | 1.8 km || 
|-id=305 bgcolor=#E9E9E9
| 484305 ||  || — || October 4, 2007 || Kitt Peak || Spacewatch || — || align=right data-sort-value="0.64" | 640 m || 
|-id=306 bgcolor=#E9E9E9
| 484306 ||  || — || October 8, 2007 || Kitt Peak || Spacewatch || — || align=right | 1.2 km || 
|-id=307 bgcolor=#E9E9E9
| 484307 ||  || — || October 8, 2007 || Mount Lemmon || Mount Lemmon Survey || — || align=right data-sort-value="0.90" | 900 m || 
|-id=308 bgcolor=#E9E9E9
| 484308 ||  || — || October 8, 2007 || Mount Lemmon || Mount Lemmon Survey || EUN || align=right data-sort-value="0.92" | 920 m || 
|-id=309 bgcolor=#E9E9E9
| 484309 ||  || — || October 6, 2007 || Kitt Peak || Spacewatch || JUN || align=right | 1.0 km || 
|-id=310 bgcolor=#E9E9E9
| 484310 ||  || — || September 13, 2007 || Mount Lemmon || Mount Lemmon Survey || — || align=right data-sort-value="0.99" | 990 m || 
|-id=311 bgcolor=#E9E9E9
| 484311 ||  || — || October 4, 2007 || Mount Lemmon || Mount Lemmon Survey || (5) || align=right data-sort-value="0.61" | 610 m || 
|-id=312 bgcolor=#E9E9E9
| 484312 ||  || — || September 12, 2007 || Catalina || CSS || — || align=right | 1.5 km || 
|-id=313 bgcolor=#E9E9E9
| 484313 ||  || — || October 8, 2007 || Catalina || CSS || — || align=right | 1.6 km || 
|-id=314 bgcolor=#E9E9E9
| 484314 ||  || — || September 11, 2007 || Mount Lemmon || Mount Lemmon Survey || — || align=right | 1.1 km || 
|-id=315 bgcolor=#E9E9E9
| 484315 ||  || — || October 9, 2007 || Kitt Peak || Spacewatch || MAR || align=right data-sort-value="0.93" | 930 m || 
|-id=316 bgcolor=#E9E9E9
| 484316 ||  || — || September 8, 2007 || Mount Lemmon || Mount Lemmon Survey || — || align=right data-sort-value="0.87" | 870 m || 
|-id=317 bgcolor=#E9E9E9
| 484317 ||  || — || October 4, 2007 || Kitt Peak || Spacewatch || EUN || align=right data-sort-value="0.94" | 940 m || 
|-id=318 bgcolor=#E9E9E9
| 484318 ||  || — || September 15, 2007 || Mount Lemmon || Mount Lemmon Survey || — || align=right data-sort-value="0.87" | 870 m || 
|-id=319 bgcolor=#E9E9E9
| 484319 ||  || — || October 9, 2007 || Mount Lemmon || Mount Lemmon Survey || — || align=right | 1.2 km || 
|-id=320 bgcolor=#E9E9E9
| 484320 ||  || — || September 11, 2007 || Mount Lemmon || Mount Lemmon Survey || — || align=right | 1.5 km || 
|-id=321 bgcolor=#E9E9E9
| 484321 ||  || — || October 8, 2007 || Kitt Peak || Spacewatch || (5) || align=right data-sort-value="0.67" | 670 m || 
|-id=322 bgcolor=#E9E9E9
| 484322 ||  || — || October 8, 2007 || Kitt Peak || Spacewatch || — || align=right data-sort-value="0.82" | 820 m || 
|-id=323 bgcolor=#E9E9E9
| 484323 ||  || — || October 8, 2007 || Kitt Peak || Spacewatch || — || align=right | 1.3 km || 
|-id=324 bgcolor=#fefefe
| 484324 ||  || — || October 9, 2007 || Mount Lemmon || Mount Lemmon Survey || — || align=right data-sort-value="0.80" | 800 m || 
|-id=325 bgcolor=#E9E9E9
| 484325 ||  || — || October 11, 2007 || Kitt Peak || Spacewatch || — || align=right | 1.2 km || 
|-id=326 bgcolor=#E9E9E9
| 484326 ||  || — || October 9, 2007 || Mount Lemmon || Mount Lemmon Survey || — || align=right data-sort-value="0.77" | 770 m || 
|-id=327 bgcolor=#E9E9E9
| 484327 ||  || — || October 13, 2007 || Mount Lemmon || Mount Lemmon Survey || EUN || align=right data-sort-value="0.84" | 840 m || 
|-id=328 bgcolor=#E9E9E9
| 484328 ||  || — || October 14, 2007 || Mount Lemmon || Mount Lemmon Survey || — || align=right data-sort-value="0.90" | 900 m || 
|-id=329 bgcolor=#E9E9E9
| 484329 ||  || — || October 14, 2007 || Kitt Peak || Spacewatch || — || align=right | 1.0 km || 
|-id=330 bgcolor=#E9E9E9
| 484330 ||  || — || October 14, 2007 || Kitt Peak || Spacewatch || — || align=right | 1.3 km || 
|-id=331 bgcolor=#E9E9E9
| 484331 ||  || — || October 11, 2007 || Kitt Peak || Spacewatch || — || align=right | 1.6 km || 
|-id=332 bgcolor=#E9E9E9
| 484332 ||  || — || October 9, 2007 || Mount Lemmon || Mount Lemmon Survey || critical || align=right data-sort-value="0.75" | 750 m || 
|-id=333 bgcolor=#E9E9E9
| 484333 ||  || — || October 10, 2007 || Catalina || CSS || — || align=right | 1.2 km || 
|-id=334 bgcolor=#E9E9E9
| 484334 ||  || — || October 14, 2007 || Mount Lemmon || Mount Lemmon Survey || — || align=right | 1.2 km || 
|-id=335 bgcolor=#E9E9E9
| 484335 ||  || — || October 7, 2007 || Mount Lemmon || Mount Lemmon Survey || — || align=right | 1.9 km || 
|-id=336 bgcolor=#E9E9E9
| 484336 ||  || — || October 15, 2007 || Catalina || CSS || — || align=right | 1.1 km || 
|-id=337 bgcolor=#E9E9E9
| 484337 ||  || — || October 19, 2007 || 7300 || W. K. Y. Yeung || (5) || align=right data-sort-value="0.61" | 610 m || 
|-id=338 bgcolor=#E9E9E9
| 484338 ||  || — || October 9, 2007 || Catalina || CSS || — || align=right | 1.2 km || 
|-id=339 bgcolor=#E9E9E9
| 484339 ||  || — || October 8, 2007 || Catalina || CSS || — || align=right | 1.4 km || 
|-id=340 bgcolor=#E9E9E9
| 484340 ||  || — || October 10, 2007 || Catalina || CSS || — || align=right | 1.4 km || 
|-id=341 bgcolor=#E9E9E9
| 484341 ||  || — || October 16, 2007 || Mount Lemmon || Mount Lemmon Survey || (5) || align=right data-sort-value="0.71" | 710 m || 
|-id=342 bgcolor=#E9E9E9
| 484342 ||  || — || October 8, 2007 || Kitt Peak || Spacewatch || — || align=right data-sort-value="0.88" | 880 m || 
|-id=343 bgcolor=#E9E9E9
| 484343 ||  || — || October 30, 2007 || Mount Lemmon || Mount Lemmon Survey || — || align=right | 1.1 km || 
|-id=344 bgcolor=#E9E9E9
| 484344 ||  || — || October 12, 2007 || Kitt Peak || Spacewatch || — || align=right data-sort-value="0.80" | 800 m || 
|-id=345 bgcolor=#E9E9E9
| 484345 ||  || — || October 14, 2007 || Mount Lemmon || Mount Lemmon Survey || JUN || align=right data-sort-value="0.95" | 950 m || 
|-id=346 bgcolor=#E9E9E9
| 484346 ||  || — || October 20, 2007 || Mount Lemmon || Mount Lemmon Survey || — || align=right | 1.0 km || 
|-id=347 bgcolor=#E9E9E9
| 484347 ||  || — || October 17, 2007 || Mount Lemmon || Mount Lemmon Survey || — || align=right | 1.6 km || 
|-id=348 bgcolor=#E9E9E9
| 484348 ||  || — || October 30, 2007 || Kitt Peak || Spacewatch || — || align=right | 1.2 km || 
|-id=349 bgcolor=#E9E9E9
| 484349 ||  || — || October 20, 2007 || Mount Lemmon || Mount Lemmon Survey || — || align=right data-sort-value="0.98" | 980 m || 
|-id=350 bgcolor=#E9E9E9
| 484350 ||  || — || November 3, 2007 || 7300 || W. K. Y. Yeung || — || align=right | 1.1 km || 
|-id=351 bgcolor=#E9E9E9
| 484351 ||  || — || November 2, 2007 || Catalina || CSS || — || align=right | 1.7 km || 
|-id=352 bgcolor=#fefefe
| 484352 ||  || — || November 1, 2007 || Kitt Peak || Spacewatch || — || align=right data-sort-value="0.91" | 910 m || 
|-id=353 bgcolor=#E9E9E9
| 484353 ||  || — || October 9, 2007 || Kitt Peak || Spacewatch || (5) || align=right data-sort-value="0.57" | 570 m || 
|-id=354 bgcolor=#E9E9E9
| 484354 ||  || — || October 7, 2007 || Kitt Peak || Spacewatch || — || align=right data-sort-value="0.92" | 920 m || 
|-id=355 bgcolor=#E9E9E9
| 484355 ||  || — || November 1, 2007 || Kitt Peak || Spacewatch || — || align=right | 1.1 km || 
|-id=356 bgcolor=#E9E9E9
| 484356 ||  || — || November 1, 2007 || Kitt Peak || Spacewatch || — || align=right | 1.2 km || 
|-id=357 bgcolor=#E9E9E9
| 484357 ||  || — || November 2, 2007 || Kitt Peak || Spacewatch || — || align=right | 1.7 km || 
|-id=358 bgcolor=#E9E9E9
| 484358 ||  || — || October 14, 2007 || Kitt Peak || Spacewatch || — || align=right | 1.2 km || 
|-id=359 bgcolor=#E9E9E9
| 484359 ||  || — || November 4, 2007 || Mount Lemmon || Mount Lemmon Survey || — || align=right | 1.4 km || 
|-id=360 bgcolor=#E9E9E9
| 484360 ||  || — || October 16, 2007 || Catalina || CSS || (1547) || align=right | 1.4 km || 
|-id=361 bgcolor=#E9E9E9
| 484361 ||  || — || October 17, 2007 || Mount Lemmon || Mount Lemmon Survey || KON || align=right | 1.9 km || 
|-id=362 bgcolor=#E9E9E9
| 484362 ||  || — || November 2, 2007 || Kitt Peak || Spacewatch || — || align=right | 1.0 km || 
|-id=363 bgcolor=#E9E9E9
| 484363 ||  || — || November 2, 2007 || Kitt Peak || Spacewatch || — || align=right | 1.6 km || 
|-id=364 bgcolor=#E9E9E9
| 484364 ||  || — || October 17, 2007 || Mount Lemmon || Mount Lemmon Survey || — || align=right data-sort-value="0.83" | 830 m || 
|-id=365 bgcolor=#E9E9E9
| 484365 ||  || — || November 3, 2007 || Kitt Peak || Spacewatch || MIS || align=right | 1.9 km || 
|-id=366 bgcolor=#E9E9E9
| 484366 ||  || — || November 3, 2007 || Kitt Peak || Spacewatch || — || align=right | 1.3 km || 
|-id=367 bgcolor=#E9E9E9
| 484367 ||  || — || November 4, 2007 || Kitt Peak || Spacewatch || — || align=right data-sort-value="0.99" | 990 m || 
|-id=368 bgcolor=#E9E9E9
| 484368 ||  || — || November 4, 2007 || Kitt Peak || Spacewatch || — || align=right | 1.1 km || 
|-id=369 bgcolor=#E9E9E9
| 484369 ||  || — || October 8, 2007 || Mount Lemmon || Mount Lemmon Survey || MIS || align=right | 2.4 km || 
|-id=370 bgcolor=#E9E9E9
| 484370 ||  || — || October 12, 2007 || Mount Lemmon || Mount Lemmon Survey || — || align=right | 1.4 km || 
|-id=371 bgcolor=#E9E9E9
| 484371 ||  || — || October 12, 2007 || Kitt Peak || Spacewatch || — || align=right data-sort-value="0.76" | 760 m || 
|-id=372 bgcolor=#E9E9E9
| 484372 ||  || — || November 9, 2007 || Kitt Peak || Spacewatch || — || align=right | 1.3 km || 
|-id=373 bgcolor=#E9E9E9
| 484373 ||  || — || November 1, 2007 || Kitt Peak || Spacewatch || MAR || align=right data-sort-value="0.96" | 960 m || 
|-id=374 bgcolor=#E9E9E9
| 484374 ||  || — || November 9, 2007 || Kitt Peak || Spacewatch || (5) || align=right data-sort-value="0.76" | 760 m || 
|-id=375 bgcolor=#E9E9E9
| 484375 ||  || — || November 9, 2007 || Kitt Peak || Spacewatch || (5) || align=right data-sort-value="0.71" | 710 m || 
|-id=376 bgcolor=#E9E9E9
| 484376 ||  || — || October 7, 2007 || Kitt Peak || Spacewatch || MAR || align=right | 1.1 km || 
|-id=377 bgcolor=#E9E9E9
| 484377 ||  || — || October 14, 2007 || Mount Lemmon || Mount Lemmon Survey || — || align=right | 1.3 km || 
|-id=378 bgcolor=#E9E9E9
| 484378 ||  || — || November 12, 2007 || Socorro || LINEAR || EUN || align=right data-sort-value="0.93" | 930 m || 
|-id=379 bgcolor=#E9E9E9
| 484379 ||  || — || November 2, 2007 || Kitt Peak || Spacewatch || — || align=right | 1.1 km || 
|-id=380 bgcolor=#E9E9E9
| 484380 ||  || — || November 3, 2007 || Kitt Peak || Spacewatch || — || align=right | 1.4 km || 
|-id=381 bgcolor=#E9E9E9
| 484381 ||  || — || November 5, 2007 || Kitt Peak || Spacewatch || — || align=right | 1.3 km || 
|-id=382 bgcolor=#d6d6d6
| 484382 ||  || — || October 15, 2007 || Mount Lemmon || Mount Lemmon Survey || 3:2 || align=right | 3.0 km || 
|-id=383 bgcolor=#E9E9E9
| 484383 ||  || — || October 7, 2007 || Kitt Peak || Spacewatch || — || align=right data-sort-value="0.75" | 750 m || 
|-id=384 bgcolor=#E9E9E9
| 484384 ||  || — || October 11, 2007 || Catalina || CSS || — || align=right | 1.6 km || 
|-id=385 bgcolor=#E9E9E9
| 484385 ||  || — || November 4, 2007 || Kitt Peak || Spacewatch || JUN || align=right | 1.1 km || 
|-id=386 bgcolor=#E9E9E9
| 484386 ||  || — || November 8, 2007 || Kitt Peak || Spacewatch || — || align=right | 1.1 km || 
|-id=387 bgcolor=#E9E9E9
| 484387 ||  || — || November 5, 2007 || Mount Lemmon || Mount Lemmon Survey || — || align=right | 1.0 km || 
|-id=388 bgcolor=#E9E9E9
| 484388 ||  || — || November 7, 2007 || Kitt Peak || Spacewatch || — || align=right | 1.1 km || 
|-id=389 bgcolor=#E9E9E9
| 484389 ||  || — || November 3, 2007 || Mount Lemmon || Mount Lemmon Survey || — || align=right | 1.0 km || 
|-id=390 bgcolor=#E9E9E9
| 484390 ||  || — || November 4, 2007 || Socorro || LINEAR || — || align=right | 1.3 km || 
|-id=391 bgcolor=#E9E9E9
| 484391 ||  || — || October 20, 2007 || Mount Lemmon || Mount Lemmon Survey || — || align=right | 1.1 km || 
|-id=392 bgcolor=#E9E9E9
| 484392 ||  || — || November 7, 2007 || Kitt Peak || Spacewatch || — || align=right data-sort-value="0.81" | 810 m || 
|-id=393 bgcolor=#E9E9E9
| 484393 ||  || — || November 18, 2007 || Mount Lemmon || Mount Lemmon Survey || MIS || align=right | 1.7 km || 
|-id=394 bgcolor=#d6d6d6
| 484394 ||  || — || November 18, 2007 || Mount Lemmon || Mount Lemmon Survey || 3:2critical || align=right | 3.2 km || 
|-id=395 bgcolor=#E9E9E9
| 484395 ||  || — || October 12, 2007 || Mount Lemmon || Mount Lemmon Survey || — || align=right | 1.2 km || 
|-id=396 bgcolor=#E9E9E9
| 484396 ||  || — || November 18, 2007 || Mount Lemmon || Mount Lemmon Survey || EUN || align=right | 1.3 km || 
|-id=397 bgcolor=#E9E9E9
| 484397 ||  || — || November 17, 2007 || Socorro || LINEAR || (1547) || align=right | 1.5 km || 
|-id=398 bgcolor=#E9E9E9
| 484398 ||  || — || November 1, 2007 || Kitt Peak || Spacewatch || — || align=right | 1.2 km || 
|-id=399 bgcolor=#E9E9E9
| 484399 ||  || — || December 4, 2007 || Catalina || CSS || (1547) || align=right | 1.3 km || 
|-id=400 bgcolor=#d6d6d6
| 484400 ||  || — || November 7, 2007 || Socorro || LINEAR || 3:2 || align=right | 3.7 km || 
|}

484401–484500 

|-bgcolor=#E9E9E9
| 484401 ||  || — || December 8, 2007 || La Sagra || OAM Obs. || — || align=right | 1.6 km || 
|-id=402 bgcolor=#FFC2E0
| 484402 ||  || — || December 8, 2007 || Siding Spring || SSS || APOPHA || align=right data-sort-value="0.45" | 450 m || 
|-id=403 bgcolor=#FFC2E0
| 484403 ||  || — || December 15, 2007 || Socorro || LINEAR || AMOcritical || align=right data-sort-value="0.19" | 190 m || 
|-id=404 bgcolor=#E9E9E9
| 484404 ||  || — || December 6, 2007 || Kitt Peak || Spacewatch || — || align=right | 1.2 km || 
|-id=405 bgcolor=#E9E9E9
| 484405 ||  || — || September 18, 2007 || Mount Lemmon || Mount Lemmon Survey || — || align=right | 1.5 km || 
|-id=406 bgcolor=#E9E9E9
| 484406 ||  || — || December 13, 2007 || Socorro || LINEAR || — || align=right | 1.4 km || 
|-id=407 bgcolor=#E9E9E9
| 484407 ||  || — || December 5, 2007 || Kitt Peak || Spacewatch || — || align=right | 1.4 km || 
|-id=408 bgcolor=#E9E9E9
| 484408 ||  || — || December 5, 2007 || Kitt Peak || Spacewatch || — || align=right | 1.2 km || 
|-id=409 bgcolor=#E9E9E9
| 484409 ||  || — || December 15, 2007 || Kitt Peak || Spacewatch || — || align=right | 1.5 km || 
|-id=410 bgcolor=#E9E9E9
| 484410 ||  || — || December 6, 2007 || Kitt Peak || Spacewatch || — || align=right | 1.5 km || 
|-id=411 bgcolor=#E9E9E9
| 484411 ||  || — || December 5, 2007 || Kitt Peak || Spacewatch || — || align=right | 1.7 km || 
|-id=412 bgcolor=#E9E9E9
| 484412 ||  || — || December 17, 2007 || Kitt Peak || Spacewatch || — || align=right | 3.0 km || 
|-id=413 bgcolor=#E9E9E9
| 484413 ||  || — || October 7, 2007 || Mount Lemmon || Mount Lemmon Survey || EUN || align=right | 1.2 km || 
|-id=414 bgcolor=#E9E9E9
| 484414 ||  || — || November 20, 2007 || Kitt Peak || Spacewatch || — || align=right | 1.3 km || 
|-id=415 bgcolor=#E9E9E9
| 484415 ||  || — || November 17, 2007 || Kitt Peak || Spacewatch || — || align=right | 1.3 km || 
|-id=416 bgcolor=#E9E9E9
| 484416 ||  || — || December 30, 2007 || Kitt Peak || Spacewatch || — || align=right | 1.3 km || 
|-id=417 bgcolor=#E9E9E9
| 484417 ||  || — || December 17, 2007 || Mount Lemmon || Mount Lemmon Survey || — || align=right | 1.6 km || 
|-id=418 bgcolor=#E9E9E9
| 484418 ||  || — || December 30, 2007 || Kitt Peak || Spacewatch || — || align=right | 1.8 km || 
|-id=419 bgcolor=#E9E9E9
| 484419 ||  || — || November 13, 2007 || Mount Lemmon || Mount Lemmon Survey || — || align=right | 1.3 km || 
|-id=420 bgcolor=#E9E9E9
| 484420 ||  || — || December 19, 2007 || Mount Lemmon || Mount Lemmon Survey || — || align=right | 1.2 km || 
|-id=421 bgcolor=#E9E9E9
| 484421 ||  || — || December 16, 2007 || Socorro || LINEAR || — || align=right | 2.2 km || 
|-id=422 bgcolor=#E9E9E9
| 484422 ||  || — || December 31, 2007 || Mount Lemmon || Mount Lemmon Survey || — || align=right | 2.8 km || 
|-id=423 bgcolor=#E9E9E9
| 484423 ||  || — || December 31, 2007 || Kitt Peak || Spacewatch || — || align=right | 2.1 km || 
|-id=424 bgcolor=#E9E9E9
| 484424 ||  || — || December 31, 2007 || Mount Lemmon || Mount Lemmon Survey || — || align=right | 1.7 km || 
|-id=425 bgcolor=#E9E9E9
| 484425 ||  || — || January 10, 2008 || Mount Lemmon || Mount Lemmon Survey || — || align=right | 1.2 km || 
|-id=426 bgcolor=#E9E9E9
| 484426 ||  || — || November 19, 2007 || Mount Lemmon || Mount Lemmon Survey || — || align=right | 1.9 km || 
|-id=427 bgcolor=#E9E9E9
| 484427 ||  || — || January 10, 2008 || Mount Lemmon || Mount Lemmon Survey || — || align=right | 1.7 km || 
|-id=428 bgcolor=#E9E9E9
| 484428 ||  || — || January 10, 2008 || Mount Lemmon || Mount Lemmon Survey || AEO || align=right | 1.0 km || 
|-id=429 bgcolor=#E9E9E9
| 484429 ||  || — || January 10, 2008 || Mount Lemmon || Mount Lemmon Survey || — || align=right | 1.3 km || 
|-id=430 bgcolor=#E9E9E9
| 484430 ||  || — || January 10, 2008 || Mount Lemmon || Mount Lemmon Survey || — || align=right | 1.9 km || 
|-id=431 bgcolor=#E9E9E9
| 484431 ||  || — || January 12, 2008 || Pla D'Arguines || R. Ferrando || — || align=right | 2.7 km || 
|-id=432 bgcolor=#E9E9E9
| 484432 ||  || — || January 10, 2008 || Mount Lemmon || Mount Lemmon Survey || — || align=right | 1.5 km || 
|-id=433 bgcolor=#E9E9E9
| 484433 ||  || — || January 10, 2008 || Mount Lemmon || Mount Lemmon Survey || — || align=right | 1.7 km || 
|-id=434 bgcolor=#E9E9E9
| 484434 ||  || — || December 14, 2007 || Mount Lemmon || Mount Lemmon Survey || (1547) || align=right | 1.5 km || 
|-id=435 bgcolor=#E9E9E9
| 484435 ||  || — || December 15, 2007 || Socorro || LINEAR || — || align=right | 1.3 km || 
|-id=436 bgcolor=#E9E9E9
| 484436 ||  || — || October 21, 2007 || Mount Lemmon || Mount Lemmon Survey || — || align=right | 1.2 km || 
|-id=437 bgcolor=#E9E9E9
| 484437 ||  || — || January 11, 2008 || Kitt Peak || Spacewatch || — || align=right | 1.2 km || 
|-id=438 bgcolor=#E9E9E9
| 484438 ||  || — || January 11, 2008 || Kitt Peak || Spacewatch || AGN || align=right | 1.2 km || 
|-id=439 bgcolor=#E9E9E9
| 484439 ||  || — || January 12, 2008 || Kitt Peak || Spacewatch || — || align=right | 1.9 km || 
|-id=440 bgcolor=#E9E9E9
| 484440 ||  || — || January 12, 2008 || Kitt Peak || Spacewatch || — || align=right | 1.5 km || 
|-id=441 bgcolor=#E9E9E9
| 484441 ||  || — || December 31, 2007 || Mount Lemmon || Mount Lemmon Survey || — || align=right | 1.5 km || 
|-id=442 bgcolor=#E9E9E9
| 484442 ||  || — || November 8, 2007 || Mount Lemmon || Mount Lemmon Survey || — || align=right | 1.9 km || 
|-id=443 bgcolor=#E9E9E9
| 484443 ||  || — || January 14, 2008 || Kitt Peak || Spacewatch || — || align=right | 1.8 km || 
|-id=444 bgcolor=#E9E9E9
| 484444 ||  || — || January 1, 2008 || Kitt Peak || Spacewatch || — || align=right | 1.3 km || 
|-id=445 bgcolor=#E9E9E9
| 484445 ||  || — || December 31, 2007 || Kitt Peak || Spacewatch || — || align=right | 1.3 km || 
|-id=446 bgcolor=#E9E9E9
| 484446 ||  || — || January 15, 2008 || Kitt Peak || Spacewatch || — || align=right | 1.6 km || 
|-id=447 bgcolor=#E9E9E9
| 484447 ||  || — || December 30, 2007 || Kitt Peak || Spacewatch || — || align=right | 1.9 km || 
|-id=448 bgcolor=#E9E9E9
| 484448 ||  || — || January 16, 2008 || Kitt Peak || Spacewatch ||  || align=right | 1.2 km || 
|-id=449 bgcolor=#E9E9E9
| 484449 ||  || — || December 31, 2007 || Kitt Peak || Spacewatch || — || align=right | 1.7 km || 
|-id=450 bgcolor=#E9E9E9
| 484450 ||  || — || January 30, 2008 || Mount Lemmon || Mount Lemmon Survey || — || align=right | 1.8 km || 
|-id=451 bgcolor=#E9E9E9
| 484451 ||  || — || December 30, 2007 || Kitt Peak || Spacewatch || — || align=right | 1.6 km || 
|-id=452 bgcolor=#E9E9E9
| 484452 ||  || — || January 31, 2008 || Mount Lemmon || Mount Lemmon Survey || — || align=right | 2.7 km || 
|-id=453 bgcolor=#E9E9E9
| 484453 ||  || — || January 30, 2008 || Mount Lemmon || Mount Lemmon Survey || — || align=right | 1.8 km || 
|-id=454 bgcolor=#E9E9E9
| 484454 ||  || — || January 18, 2008 || Mount Lemmon || Mount Lemmon Survey || JUN || align=right data-sort-value="0.96" | 960 m || 
|-id=455 bgcolor=#E9E9E9
| 484455 ||  || — || January 30, 2008 || Mount Lemmon || Mount Lemmon Survey || — || align=right | 2.0 km || 
|-id=456 bgcolor=#E9E9E9
| 484456 ||  || — || January 17, 2008 || Mount Lemmon || Mount Lemmon Survey || — || align=right | 1.9 km || 
|-id=457 bgcolor=#E9E9E9
| 484457 ||  || — || February 1, 2008 || Mount Lemmon || Mount Lemmon Survey || — || align=right | 1.4 km || 
|-id=458 bgcolor=#E9E9E9
| 484458 ||  || — || January 10, 2008 || Kitt Peak || Spacewatch || — || align=right | 1.7 km || 
|-id=459 bgcolor=#E9E9E9
| 484459 ||  || — || February 3, 2008 || Kitt Peak || Spacewatch || — || align=right | 1.7 km || 
|-id=460 bgcolor=#E9E9E9
| 484460 ||  || — || February 3, 2008 || Kitt Peak || Spacewatch || — || align=right | 1.7 km || 
|-id=461 bgcolor=#E9E9E9
| 484461 ||  || — || February 3, 2008 || Kitt Peak || Spacewatch || GEF || align=right | 1.2 km || 
|-id=462 bgcolor=#FFC2E0
| 484462 ||  || — || February 8, 2008 || Mount Lemmon || Mount Lemmon Survey || APO || align=right data-sort-value="0.18" | 180 m || 
|-id=463 bgcolor=#E9E9E9
| 484463 ||  || — || December 31, 2007 || Mount Lemmon || Mount Lemmon Survey || — || align=right | 1.9 km || 
|-id=464 bgcolor=#E9E9E9
| 484464 ||  || — || December 31, 2007 || Mount Lemmon || Mount Lemmon Survey || — || align=right | 1.7 km || 
|-id=465 bgcolor=#E9E9E9
| 484465 ||  || — || February 3, 2008 || Kitt Peak || Spacewatch || — || align=right | 2.0 km || 
|-id=466 bgcolor=#E9E9E9
| 484466 ||  || — || February 7, 2008 || Mount Lemmon || Mount Lemmon Survey || — || align=right | 1.3 km || 
|-id=467 bgcolor=#E9E9E9
| 484467 ||  || — || February 7, 2008 || Mount Lemmon || Mount Lemmon Survey || ADE || align=right | 1.8 km || 
|-id=468 bgcolor=#E9E9E9
| 484468 ||  || — || February 8, 2008 || Mount Lemmon || Mount Lemmon Survey || — || align=right | 1.5 km || 
|-id=469 bgcolor=#d6d6d6
| 484469 ||  || — || February 7, 2008 || Mount Lemmon || Mount Lemmon Survey || — || align=right | 2.0 km || 
|-id=470 bgcolor=#E9E9E9
| 484470 ||  || — || February 8, 2008 || Kitt Peak || Spacewatch || HOF || align=right | 2.2 km || 
|-id=471 bgcolor=#E9E9E9
| 484471 ||  || — || December 30, 2007 || Kitt Peak || Spacewatch || — || align=right | 1.9 km || 
|-id=472 bgcolor=#E9E9E9
| 484472 ||  || — || December 31, 2007 || Kitt Peak || Spacewatch || EUN || align=right data-sort-value="0.94" | 940 m || 
|-id=473 bgcolor=#E9E9E9
| 484473 ||  || — || January 18, 2008 || Kitt Peak || Spacewatch || — || align=right | 1.5 km || 
|-id=474 bgcolor=#E9E9E9
| 484474 ||  || — || February 9, 2008 || Kitt Peak || Spacewatch || — || align=right | 1.9 km || 
|-id=475 bgcolor=#E9E9E9
| 484475 ||  || — || February 9, 2008 || Mount Lemmon || Mount Lemmon Survey || — || align=right | 1.8 km || 
|-id=476 bgcolor=#E9E9E9
| 484476 ||  || — || February 13, 2008 || Anderson Mesa || LONEOS || — || align=right | 1.6 km || 
|-id=477 bgcolor=#E9E9E9
| 484477 ||  || — || December 20, 2007 || Mount Lemmon || Mount Lemmon Survey || — || align=right | 2.0 km || 
|-id=478 bgcolor=#E9E9E9
| 484478 ||  || — || January 30, 2008 || Mount Lemmon || Mount Lemmon Survey || AEO || align=right data-sort-value="0.94" | 940 m || 
|-id=479 bgcolor=#E9E9E9
| 484479 ||  || — || January 11, 2008 || Mount Lemmon || Mount Lemmon Survey || WIT || align=right data-sort-value="0.86" | 860 m || 
|-id=480 bgcolor=#E9E9E9
| 484480 ||  || — || February 8, 2008 || Mount Lemmon || Mount Lemmon Survey || — || align=right | 1.5 km || 
|-id=481 bgcolor=#E9E9E9
| 484481 ||  || — || February 9, 2008 || Kitt Peak || Spacewatch || — || align=right | 1.9 km || 
|-id=482 bgcolor=#E9E9E9
| 484482 ||  || — || February 9, 2008 || Catalina || CSS || — || align=right | 2.6 km || 
|-id=483 bgcolor=#E9E9E9
| 484483 ||  || — || February 9, 2008 || Kitt Peak || Spacewatch || — || align=right | 1.9 km || 
|-id=484 bgcolor=#E9E9E9
| 484484 ||  || — || February 12, 2008 || Mount Lemmon || Mount Lemmon Survey || — || align=right | 2.0 km || 
|-id=485 bgcolor=#E9E9E9
| 484485 ||  || — || January 31, 2008 || Catalina || CSS || — || align=right | 1.6 km || 
|-id=486 bgcolor=#E9E9E9
| 484486 ||  || — || December 14, 2007 || Mount Lemmon || Mount Lemmon Survey || JUN || align=right data-sort-value="0.93" | 930 m || 
|-id=487 bgcolor=#E9E9E9
| 484487 ||  || — || February 6, 2008 || Mayhill || A. Lowe || — || align=right | 1.7 km || 
|-id=488 bgcolor=#E9E9E9
| 484488 ||  || — || February 2, 2008 || Kitt Peak || Spacewatch || — || align=right | 2.0 km || 
|-id=489 bgcolor=#E9E9E9
| 484489 ||  || — || February 2, 2008 || Kitt Peak || Spacewatch || — || align=right | 1.7 km || 
|-id=490 bgcolor=#E9E9E9
| 484490 ||  || — || February 13, 2008 || Mount Lemmon || Mount Lemmon Survey || GEF || align=right data-sort-value="0.98" | 980 m || 
|-id=491 bgcolor=#E9E9E9
| 484491 ||  || — || February 11, 2008 || Kitt Peak || Spacewatch || — || align=right | 1.9 km || 
|-id=492 bgcolor=#E9E9E9
| 484492 ||  || — || February 12, 2008 || Kitt Peak || Spacewatch || — || align=right | 1.7 km || 
|-id=493 bgcolor=#E9E9E9
| 484493 ||  || — || December 5, 2007 || Mount Lemmon || Mount Lemmon Survey || — || align=right | 1.6 km || 
|-id=494 bgcolor=#E9E9E9
| 484494 ||  || — || February 3, 2008 || Kitt Peak || Spacewatch || — || align=right | 1.8 km || 
|-id=495 bgcolor=#E9E9E9
| 484495 ||  || — || January 31, 2008 || Kitt Peak || Spacewatch || — || align=right | 2.3 km || 
|-id=496 bgcolor=#E9E9E9
| 484496 ||  || — || February 27, 2008 || Kitt Peak || Spacewatch || — || align=right | 2.8 km || 
|-id=497 bgcolor=#E9E9E9
| 484497 ||  || — || February 11, 2008 || Mount Lemmon || Mount Lemmon Survey || — || align=right | 2.2 km || 
|-id=498 bgcolor=#E9E9E9
| 484498 ||  || — || February 28, 2008 || Kitt Peak || Spacewatch || — || align=right | 1.8 km || 
|-id=499 bgcolor=#E9E9E9
| 484499 ||  || — || February 27, 2008 || Catalina || CSS || — || align=right | 2.0 km || 
|-id=500 bgcolor=#E9E9E9
| 484500 ||  || — || January 11, 2008 || Kitt Peak || Spacewatch || — || align=right | 1.7 km || 
|}

484501–484600 

|-bgcolor=#E9E9E9
| 484501 ||  || — || February 28, 2008 || Mount Lemmon || Mount Lemmon Survey || — || align=right | 1.8 km || 
|-id=502 bgcolor=#E9E9E9
| 484502 ||  || — || February 28, 2008 || Kitt Peak || Spacewatch ||  || align=right | 2.0 km || 
|-id=503 bgcolor=#E9E9E9
| 484503 ||  || — || February 29, 2008 || Kitt Peak || Spacewatch || — || align=right | 1.8 km || 
|-id=504 bgcolor=#E9E9E9
| 484504 ||  || — || February 18, 2008 || Mount Lemmon || Mount Lemmon Survey || — || align=right | 2.1 km || 
|-id=505 bgcolor=#E9E9E9
| 484505 ||  || — || February 25, 2008 || Mount Lemmon || Mount Lemmon Survey || — || align=right | 2.2 km || 
|-id=506 bgcolor=#FFC2E0
| 484506 ||  || — || March 6, 2008 || Kitt Peak || Spacewatch || APOPHA || align=right data-sort-value="0.36" | 360 m || 
|-id=507 bgcolor=#d6d6d6
| 484507 ||  || — || February 10, 2008 || Kitt Peak || Spacewatch || — || align=right | 2.2 km || 
|-id=508 bgcolor=#E9E9E9
| 484508 ||  || — || March 1, 2008 || Kitt Peak || Spacewatch || — || align=right | 1.7 km || 
|-id=509 bgcolor=#E9E9E9
| 484509 ||  || — || December 18, 2007 || Mount Lemmon || Mount Lemmon Survey || — || align=right | 1.8 km || 
|-id=510 bgcolor=#E9E9E9
| 484510 ||  || — || March 2, 2008 || Kitt Peak || Spacewatch || — || align=right | 2.8 km || 
|-id=511 bgcolor=#E9E9E9
| 484511 ||  || — || February 9, 2008 || Kitt Peak || Spacewatch || — || align=right | 1.2 km || 
|-id=512 bgcolor=#E9E9E9
| 484512 ||  || — || March 4, 2008 || Mount Lemmon || Mount Lemmon Survey || — || align=right | 2.2 km || 
|-id=513 bgcolor=#E9E9E9
| 484513 ||  || — || March 4, 2008 || Kitt Peak || Spacewatch || — || align=right | 1.5 km || 
|-id=514 bgcolor=#E9E9E9
| 484514 ||  || — || January 30, 2008 || Mount Lemmon || Mount Lemmon Survey || DOR || align=right | 2.7 km || 
|-id=515 bgcolor=#E9E9E9
| 484515 ||  || — || March 6, 2008 || Kitt Peak || Spacewatch || — || align=right | 1.6 km || 
|-id=516 bgcolor=#E9E9E9
| 484516 ||  || — || March 6, 2008 || Mount Lemmon || Mount Lemmon Survey || — || align=right | 2.6 km || 
|-id=517 bgcolor=#FFC2E0
| 484517 ||  || — || March 11, 2008 || Catalina || CSS || AMO +1kmPHA || align=right | 1.4 km || 
|-id=518 bgcolor=#E9E9E9
| 484518 ||  || — || March 3, 2008 || Purple Mountain || PMO NEO || — || align=right | 2.1 km || 
|-id=519 bgcolor=#E9E9E9
| 484519 ||  || — || February 2, 2008 || Kitt Peak || Spacewatch || — || align=right | 2.3 km || 
|-id=520 bgcolor=#E9E9E9
| 484520 ||  || — || February 2, 2008 || Kitt Peak || Spacewatch || — || align=right | 1.9 km || 
|-id=521 bgcolor=#E9E9E9
| 484521 ||  || — || March 8, 2008 || Catalina || CSS || — || align=right | 2.2 km || 
|-id=522 bgcolor=#E9E9E9
| 484522 ||  || — || March 9, 2008 || Kitt Peak || Spacewatch || — || align=right | 1.6 km || 
|-id=523 bgcolor=#E9E9E9
| 484523 ||  || — || March 1, 2008 || Kitt Peak || Spacewatch || DOR || align=right | 1.9 km || 
|-id=524 bgcolor=#E9E9E9
| 484524 ||  || — || February 2, 2008 || Mount Lemmon || Mount Lemmon Survey || GEF || align=right | 1.1 km || 
|-id=525 bgcolor=#E9E9E9
| 484525 ||  || — || February 7, 2008 || Socorro || LINEAR || — || align=right | 2.9 km || 
|-id=526 bgcolor=#E9E9E9
| 484526 ||  || — || March 11, 2008 || Kitt Peak || Spacewatch || — || align=right | 1.7 km || 
|-id=527 bgcolor=#E9E9E9
| 484527 ||  || — || March 15, 2008 || Mount Lemmon || Mount Lemmon Survey || — || align=right | 1.5 km || 
|-id=528 bgcolor=#E9E9E9
| 484528 ||  || — || March 13, 2008 || Kitt Peak || Spacewatch || — || align=right | 1.4 km || 
|-id=529 bgcolor=#E9E9E9
| 484529 ||  || — || March 2, 2008 || Mount Lemmon || Mount Lemmon Survey || — || align=right | 1.7 km || 
|-id=530 bgcolor=#E9E9E9
| 484530 ||  || — || March 7, 2008 || Socorro || LINEAR || — || align=right | 2.3 km || 
|-id=531 bgcolor=#E9E9E9
| 484531 ||  || — || March 25, 2008 || Kitt Peak || Spacewatch || — || align=right | 2.2 km || 
|-id=532 bgcolor=#E9E9E9
| 484532 ||  || — || March 8, 2008 || Mount Lemmon || Mount Lemmon Survey || — || align=right | 2.2 km || 
|-id=533 bgcolor=#d6d6d6
| 484533 ||  || — || March 10, 2008 || Kitt Peak || Spacewatch || — || align=right | 2.1 km || 
|-id=534 bgcolor=#E9E9E9
| 484534 ||  || — || March 28, 2008 || Mount Lemmon || Mount Lemmon Survey || — || align=right | 1.4 km || 
|-id=535 bgcolor=#FA8072
| 484535 ||  || — || March 28, 2008 || Kitt Peak || Spacewatch || — || align=right | 2.2 km || 
|-id=536 bgcolor=#E9E9E9
| 484536 ||  || — || March 27, 2008 || Mount Lemmon || Mount Lemmon Survey || DOR || align=right | 2.0 km || 
|-id=537 bgcolor=#fefefe
| 484537 ||  || — || March 28, 2008 || Kitt Peak || Spacewatch || critical || align=right data-sort-value="0.52" | 520 m || 
|-id=538 bgcolor=#E9E9E9
| 484538 ||  || — || March 29, 2008 || Mount Lemmon || Mount Lemmon Survey || — || align=right | 2.5 km || 
|-id=539 bgcolor=#E9E9E9
| 484539 ||  || — || March 30, 2008 || Kitt Peak || Spacewatch || — || align=right | 1.8 km || 
|-id=540 bgcolor=#C2FFFF
| 484540 ||  || — || March 11, 2008 || Mount Lemmon || Mount Lemmon Survey || L5 || align=right | 12 km || 
|-id=541 bgcolor=#E9E9E9
| 484541 ||  || — || March 8, 2008 || Mount Lemmon || Mount Lemmon Survey || — || align=right | 1.7 km || 
|-id=542 bgcolor=#d6d6d6
| 484542 ||  || — || April 1, 2008 || Kitt Peak || Spacewatch || EOS || align=right | 1.7 km || 
|-id=543 bgcolor=#d6d6d6
| 484543 ||  || — || April 1, 2008 || Kitt Peak || Spacewatch || — || align=right | 2.9 km || 
|-id=544 bgcolor=#E9E9E9
| 484544 ||  || — || April 3, 2008 || Kitt Peak || Spacewatch || — || align=right | 1.8 km || 
|-id=545 bgcolor=#C2FFFF
| 484545 ||  || — || April 3, 2008 || Kitt Peak || Spacewatch || L5 || align=right | 6.6 km || 
|-id=546 bgcolor=#E9E9E9
| 484546 ||  || — || March 11, 2008 || Kitt Peak || Spacewatch || — || align=right | 2.0 km || 
|-id=547 bgcolor=#d6d6d6
| 484547 ||  || — || March 29, 2008 || Kitt Peak || Spacewatch || — || align=right | 2.0 km || 
|-id=548 bgcolor=#E9E9E9
| 484548 ||  || — || March 5, 2008 || Kitt Peak || Spacewatch || — || align=right | 2.6 km || 
|-id=549 bgcolor=#C2FFFF
| 484549 ||  || — || April 7, 2008 || Kitt Peak || Spacewatch || L5 || align=right | 7.8 km || 
|-id=550 bgcolor=#d6d6d6
| 484550 ||  || — || April 7, 2008 || Kitt Peak || Spacewatch || — || align=right | 2.0 km || 
|-id=551 bgcolor=#E9E9E9
| 484551 ||  || — || March 30, 2008 || Catalina || CSS || — || align=right | 2.4 km || 
|-id=552 bgcolor=#E9E9E9
| 484552 ||  || — || April 15, 2008 || Catalina || CSS || — || align=right | 1.9 km || 
|-id=553 bgcolor=#C2FFFF
| 484553 ||  || — || April 6, 2008 || Mount Lemmon || Mount Lemmon Survey || L5 || align=right | 8.2 km || 
|-id=554 bgcolor=#E9E9E9
| 484554 ||  || — || April 2, 2008 || Socorro || LINEAR || — || align=right | 2.0 km || 
|-id=555 bgcolor=#d6d6d6
| 484555 ||  || — || April 3, 2008 || Mount Lemmon || Mount Lemmon Survey || — || align=right | 2.2 km || 
|-id=556 bgcolor=#d6d6d6
| 484556 ||  || — || April 26, 2008 || Kitt Peak || Spacewatch || — || align=right | 2.3 km || 
|-id=557 bgcolor=#C2FFFF
| 484557 ||  || — || March 29, 2008 || Kitt Peak || Spacewatch || L5 || align=right | 7.8 km || 
|-id=558 bgcolor=#E9E9E9
| 484558 ||  || — || April 28, 2008 || Kitt Peak || Spacewatch || — || align=right | 3.1 km || 
|-id=559 bgcolor=#C2FFFF
| 484559 ||  || — || February 6, 2008 || Kitt Peak || Spacewatch || L5 || align=right | 7.9 km || 
|-id=560 bgcolor=#E9E9E9
| 484560 ||  || — || April 30, 2008 || Kitt Peak || Spacewatch || — || align=right | 2.4 km || 
|-id=561 bgcolor=#d6d6d6
| 484561 ||  || — || March 31, 2003 || Anderson Mesa || LONEOS || — || align=right | 2.2 km || 
|-id=562 bgcolor=#d6d6d6
| 484562 ||  || — || April 29, 2008 || Kitt Peak || Spacewatch || EOS || align=right | 1.7 km || 
|-id=563 bgcolor=#d6d6d6
| 484563 ||  || — || May 4, 2008 || Kitt Peak || Spacewatch || — || align=right | 3.0 km || 
|-id=564 bgcolor=#d6d6d6
| 484564 ||  || — || May 11, 2008 || Mount Lemmon || Mount Lemmon Survey || — || align=right | 2.9 km || 
|-id=565 bgcolor=#d6d6d6
| 484565 ||  || — || May 30, 2008 || Kitt Peak || Spacewatch || — || align=right | 2.5 km || 
|-id=566 bgcolor=#C2FFFF
| 484566 ||  || — || May 30, 2008 || Kitt Peak || Spacewatch || L5 || align=right | 7.2 km || 
|-id=567 bgcolor=#d6d6d6
| 484567 ||  || — || May 5, 2008 || Kitt Peak || Spacewatch || — || align=right | 2.3 km || 
|-id=568 bgcolor=#C2FFFF
| 484568 ||  || — || April 11, 2008 || Mount Lemmon || Mount Lemmon Survey || L5 || align=right | 10 km || 
|-id=569 bgcolor=#d6d6d6
| 484569 ||  || — || June 3, 2008 || Mount Lemmon || Mount Lemmon Survey || — || align=right | 3.7 km || 
|-id=570 bgcolor=#d6d6d6
| 484570 ||  || — || May 3, 2008 || Mount Lemmon || Mount Lemmon Survey || — || align=right | 2.4 km || 
|-id=571 bgcolor=#FA8072
| 484571 ||  || — || June 6, 2008 || Kitt Peak || Spacewatch || — || align=right data-sort-value="0.98" | 980 m || 
|-id=572 bgcolor=#fefefe
| 484572 ||  || — || July 25, 2008 || La Sagra || OAM Obs. || — || align=right | 1.2 km || 
|-id=573 bgcolor=#d6d6d6
| 484573 ||  || — || July 31, 2008 || Socorro || LINEAR || — || align=right | 3.9 km || 
|-id=574 bgcolor=#fefefe
| 484574 ||  || — || August 27, 2008 || La Sagra || OAM Obs. || — || align=right | 1.1 km || 
|-id=575 bgcolor=#fefefe
| 484575 ||  || — || July 30, 2008 || Mount Lemmon || Mount Lemmon Survey || — || align=right data-sort-value="0.73" | 730 m || 
|-id=576 bgcolor=#fefefe
| 484576 ||  || — || August 26, 2008 || La Sagra || OAM Obs. || — || align=right data-sort-value="0.83" | 830 m || 
|-id=577 bgcolor=#fefefe
| 484577 ||  || — || July 30, 2008 || Kitt Peak || Spacewatch || — || align=right data-sort-value="0.90" | 900 m || 
|-id=578 bgcolor=#d6d6d6
| 484578 ||  || — || July 29, 2008 || Kitt Peak || Spacewatch || — || align=right | 2.8 km || 
|-id=579 bgcolor=#fefefe
| 484579 ||  || — || August 30, 2008 || Dauban || F. Kugel || — || align=right data-sort-value="0.92" | 920 m || 
|-id=580 bgcolor=#fefefe
| 484580 ||  || — || August 9, 2008 || La Sagra || OAM Obs. || — || align=right data-sort-value="0.83" | 830 m || 
|-id=581 bgcolor=#fefefe
| 484581 ||  || — || August 30, 2008 || La Sagra || OAM Obs. || V || align=right data-sort-value="0.82" | 820 m || 
|-id=582 bgcolor=#d6d6d6
| 484582 ||  || — || July 30, 2008 || Kitt Peak || Spacewatch || — || align=right | 3.0 km || 
|-id=583 bgcolor=#d6d6d6
| 484583 ||  || — || August 29, 2008 || La Sagra || OAM Obs. || — || align=right | 3.9 km || 
|-id=584 bgcolor=#fefefe
| 484584 ||  || — || August 23, 2008 || Kitt Peak || Spacewatch || NYS || align=right data-sort-value="0.56" | 560 m || 
|-id=585 bgcolor=#fefefe
| 484585 ||  || — || September 2, 2008 || Kitt Peak || Spacewatch || — || align=right data-sort-value="0.59" | 590 m || 
|-id=586 bgcolor=#fefefe
| 484586 ||  || — || September 2, 2008 || Kitt Peak || Spacewatch || — || align=right data-sort-value="0.76" | 760 m || 
|-id=587 bgcolor=#d6d6d6
| 484587 ||  || — || September 3, 2008 || Kitt Peak || Spacewatch || — || align=right | 2.7 km || 
|-id=588 bgcolor=#fefefe
| 484588 ||  || — || September 3, 2008 || Kitt Peak || Spacewatch || NYS || align=right data-sort-value="0.66" | 660 m || 
|-id=589 bgcolor=#fefefe
| 484589 ||  || — || September 2, 2008 || La Sagra || OAM Obs. || — || align=right data-sort-value="0.97" | 970 m || 
|-id=590 bgcolor=#fefefe
| 484590 ||  || — || August 26, 2008 || La Sagra || OAM Obs. || H || align=right data-sort-value="0.61" | 610 m || 
|-id=591 bgcolor=#fefefe
| 484591 ||  || — || September 4, 2008 || Kitt Peak || Spacewatch || — || align=right data-sort-value="0.71" | 710 m || 
|-id=592 bgcolor=#d6d6d6
| 484592 ||  || — || September 6, 2008 || Mount Lemmon || Mount Lemmon Survey || — || align=right | 2.8 km || 
|-id=593 bgcolor=#d6d6d6
| 484593 ||  || — || September 6, 2008 || Kitt Peak || Spacewatch || — || align=right | 3.1 km || 
|-id=594 bgcolor=#d6d6d6
| 484594 ||  || — || September 7, 2008 || Mount Lemmon || Mount Lemmon Survey || THM || align=right | 1.9 km || 
|-id=595 bgcolor=#fefefe
| 484595 ||  || — || September 9, 2008 || Mount Lemmon || Mount Lemmon Survey || — || align=right data-sort-value="0.69" | 690 m || 
|-id=596 bgcolor=#d6d6d6
| 484596 ||  || — || September 7, 2008 || Mount Lemmon || Mount Lemmon Survey || EOS || align=right | 1.7 km || 
|-id=597 bgcolor=#fefefe
| 484597 ||  || — || September 4, 2008 || Kitt Peak || Spacewatch || NYS || align=right data-sort-value="0.75" | 750 m || 
|-id=598 bgcolor=#d6d6d6
| 484598 ||  || — || September 6, 2008 || Mount Lemmon || Mount Lemmon Survey || — || align=right | 3.0 km || 
|-id=599 bgcolor=#fefefe
| 484599 ||  || — || September 6, 2008 || Kitt Peak || Spacewatch || — || align=right data-sort-value="0.75" | 750 m || 
|-id=600 bgcolor=#fefefe
| 484600 ||  || — || September 4, 2008 || Socorro || LINEAR || — || align=right data-sort-value="0.75" | 750 m || 
|}

484601–484700 

|-bgcolor=#fefefe
| 484601 ||  || — || September 21, 2008 || Grove Creek || F. Tozzi || — || align=right data-sort-value="0.71" | 710 m || 
|-id=602 bgcolor=#fefefe
| 484602 ||  || — || January 5, 2006 || Mount Lemmon || Mount Lemmon Survey || — || align=right data-sort-value="0.75" | 750 m || 
|-id=603 bgcolor=#fefefe
| 484603 ||  || — || September 3, 2008 || Kitt Peak || Spacewatch || — || align=right data-sort-value="0.67" | 670 m || 
|-id=604 bgcolor=#d6d6d6
| 484604 ||  || — || September 20, 2008 || Mount Lemmon || Mount Lemmon Survey || — || align=right | 3.2 km || 
|-id=605 bgcolor=#fefefe
| 484605 ||  || — || August 27, 2008 || La Sagra || OAM Obs. || — || align=right data-sort-value="0.84" | 840 m || 
|-id=606 bgcolor=#fefefe
| 484606 ||  || — || September 6, 2008 || Mount Lemmon || Mount Lemmon Survey || — || align=right data-sort-value="0.78" | 780 m || 
|-id=607 bgcolor=#fefefe
| 484607 ||  || — || September 20, 2008 || Kitt Peak || Spacewatch || — || align=right data-sort-value="0.69" | 690 m || 
|-id=608 bgcolor=#fefefe
| 484608 ||  || — || September 20, 2008 || Kitt Peak || Spacewatch || V || align=right data-sort-value="0.64" | 640 m || 
|-id=609 bgcolor=#fefefe
| 484609 ||  || — || September 20, 2008 || Kitt Peak || Spacewatch || — || align=right data-sort-value="0.87" | 870 m || 
|-id=610 bgcolor=#fefefe
| 484610 ||  || — || September 20, 2008 || Kitt Peak || Spacewatch || MAS || align=right data-sort-value="0.75" | 750 m || 
|-id=611 bgcolor=#fefefe
| 484611 ||  || — || September 20, 2008 || Catalina || CSS || NYS || align=right data-sort-value="0.65" | 650 m || 
|-id=612 bgcolor=#fefefe
| 484612 ||  || — || September 4, 2008 || Socorro || LINEAR || — || align=right data-sort-value="0.86" | 860 m || 
|-id=613 bgcolor=#fefefe
| 484613 Cerebrito ||  ||  || September 26, 2008 || La Cañada || J. Lacruz || — || align=right data-sort-value="0.68" | 680 m || 
|-id=614 bgcolor=#d6d6d6
| 484614 ||  || — || July 30, 2008 || Kitt Peak || Spacewatch || — || align=right | 2.9 km || 
|-id=615 bgcolor=#fefefe
| 484615 ||  || — || September 21, 2008 || Kitt Peak || Spacewatch || — || align=right data-sort-value="0.93" | 930 m || 
|-id=616 bgcolor=#FA8072
| 484616 ||  || — || September 21, 2008 || Catalina || CSS || — || align=right data-sort-value="0.90" | 900 m || 
|-id=617 bgcolor=#fefefe
| 484617 ||  || — || September 22, 2008 || Kitt Peak || Spacewatch || NYS || align=right data-sort-value="0.54" | 540 m || 
|-id=618 bgcolor=#fefefe
| 484618 ||  || — || September 22, 2008 || Mount Lemmon || Mount Lemmon Survey || — || align=right data-sort-value="0.73" | 730 m || 
|-id=619 bgcolor=#fefefe
| 484619 ||  || — || September 6, 2008 || Mount Lemmon || Mount Lemmon Survey || NYS || align=right data-sort-value="0.55" | 550 m || 
|-id=620 bgcolor=#fefefe
| 484620 ||  || — || September 22, 2008 || Mount Lemmon || Mount Lemmon Survey || MAS || align=right data-sort-value="0.52" | 520 m || 
|-id=621 bgcolor=#fefefe
| 484621 ||  || — || September 22, 2008 || Mount Lemmon || Mount Lemmon Survey || — || align=right data-sort-value="0.62" | 620 m || 
|-id=622 bgcolor=#fefefe
| 484622 ||  || — || September 22, 2008 || Mount Lemmon || Mount Lemmon Survey || — || align=right data-sort-value="0.67" | 670 m || 
|-id=623 bgcolor=#fefefe
| 484623 ||  || — || September 22, 2008 || Kitt Peak || Spacewatch || NYS || align=right data-sort-value="0.63" | 630 m || 
|-id=624 bgcolor=#fefefe
| 484624 ||  || — || September 24, 2008 || Mount Lemmon || Mount Lemmon Survey || — || align=right data-sort-value="0.73" | 730 m || 
|-id=625 bgcolor=#fefefe
| 484625 ||  || — || September 24, 2008 || Mount Lemmon || Mount Lemmon Survey || H || align=right data-sort-value="0.58" | 580 m || 
|-id=626 bgcolor=#d6d6d6
| 484626 ||  || — || September 26, 2008 || Mount Lemmon || Mount Lemmon Survey || URS || align=right | 3.5 km || 
|-id=627 bgcolor=#d6d6d6
| 484627 ||  || — || September 3, 2008 || Kitt Peak || Spacewatch || — || align=right | 3.0 km || 
|-id=628 bgcolor=#fefefe
| 484628 ||  || — || September 28, 2008 || Socorro || LINEAR || — || align=right data-sort-value="0.98" | 980 m || 
|-id=629 bgcolor=#d6d6d6
| 484629 ||  || — || September 4, 2008 || Kitt Peak || Spacewatch || 7:4 || align=right | 3.4 km || 
|-id=630 bgcolor=#fefefe
| 484630 ||  || — || September 28, 2008 || Socorro || LINEAR || — || align=right data-sort-value="0.71" | 710 m || 
|-id=631 bgcolor=#fefefe
| 484631 ||  || — || September 9, 2008 || Mount Lemmon || Mount Lemmon Survey || — || align=right data-sort-value="0.86" | 860 m || 
|-id=632 bgcolor=#fefefe
| 484632 ||  || — || September 21, 2008 || Kitt Peak || Spacewatch || — || align=right data-sort-value="0.65" | 650 m || 
|-id=633 bgcolor=#fefefe
| 484633 ||  || — || September 7, 2008 || Mount Lemmon || Mount Lemmon Survey || — || align=right data-sort-value="0.81" | 810 m || 
|-id=634 bgcolor=#d6d6d6
| 484634 ||  || — || September 6, 2008 || Kitt Peak || Spacewatch || — || align=right | 3.1 km || 
|-id=635 bgcolor=#fefefe
| 484635 ||  || — || September 26, 2008 || Kitt Peak || Spacewatch || — || align=right | 1.0 km || 
|-id=636 bgcolor=#fefefe
| 484636 ||  || — || September 5, 2008 || Kitt Peak || Spacewatch || — || align=right | 1.00 km || 
|-id=637 bgcolor=#fefefe
| 484637 ||  || — || September 28, 2008 || Mount Lemmon || Mount Lemmon Survey || — || align=right data-sort-value="0.54" | 540 m || 
|-id=638 bgcolor=#fefefe
| 484638 ||  || — || September 23, 2008 || Mount Lemmon || Mount Lemmon Survey || — || align=right data-sort-value="0.75" | 750 m || 
|-id=639 bgcolor=#fefefe
| 484639 ||  || — || September 25, 2008 || Kitt Peak || Spacewatch || — || align=right data-sort-value="0.63" | 630 m || 
|-id=640 bgcolor=#d6d6d6
| 484640 ||  || — || September 23, 2008 || Kitt Peak || Spacewatch || — || align=right | 3.0 km || 
|-id=641 bgcolor=#fefefe
| 484641 ||  || — || March 10, 2007 || Mount Lemmon || Mount Lemmon Survey || — || align=right data-sort-value="0.82" | 820 m || 
|-id=642 bgcolor=#d6d6d6
| 484642 ||  || — || September 25, 2008 || Kitt Peak || Spacewatch || 7:4 || align=right | 3.6 km || 
|-id=643 bgcolor=#fefefe
| 484643 ||  || — || September 28, 2008 || Socorro || LINEAR || H || align=right data-sort-value="0.64" | 640 m || 
|-id=644 bgcolor=#E9E9E9
| 484644 ||  || — || September 29, 2008 || Catalina || CSS || — || align=right | 1.3 km || 
|-id=645 bgcolor=#fefefe
| 484645 ||  || — || September 29, 2008 || Mount Lemmon || Mount Lemmon Survey || NYS || align=right data-sort-value="0.62" | 620 m || 
|-id=646 bgcolor=#fefefe
| 484646 ||  || — || October 3, 2008 || La Sagra || OAM Obs. || V || align=right data-sort-value="0.68" | 680 m || 
|-id=647 bgcolor=#fefefe
| 484647 ||  || — || October 1, 2008 || Goodricke-Pigott || R. A. Tucker || — || align=right data-sort-value="0.87" | 870 m || 
|-id=648 bgcolor=#fefefe
| 484648 ||  || — || September 30, 2008 || La Sagra || OAM Obs. || V || align=right data-sort-value="0.56" | 560 m || 
|-id=649 bgcolor=#fefefe
| 484649 ||  || — || October 1, 2008 || Kitt Peak || Spacewatch || NYS || align=right data-sort-value="0.52" | 520 m || 
|-id=650 bgcolor=#fefefe
| 484650 ||  || — || October 1, 2008 || Kitt Peak || Spacewatch || — || align=right data-sort-value="0.90" | 900 m || 
|-id=651 bgcolor=#fefefe
| 484651 ||  || — || September 5, 2008 || Kitt Peak || Spacewatch || critical || align=right data-sort-value="0.82" | 820 m || 
|-id=652 bgcolor=#fefefe
| 484652 ||  || — || October 3, 2008 || Kitt Peak || Spacewatch || — || align=right data-sort-value="0.77" | 770 m || 
|-id=653 bgcolor=#fefefe
| 484653 ||  || — || September 23, 2008 || Kitt Peak || Spacewatch || — || align=right data-sort-value="0.82" | 820 m || 
|-id=654 bgcolor=#fefefe
| 484654 ||  || — || September 2, 2008 || Kitt Peak || Spacewatch || — || align=right data-sort-value="0.68" | 680 m || 
|-id=655 bgcolor=#fefefe
| 484655 ||  || — || September 23, 2008 || Mount Lemmon || Mount Lemmon Survey || — || align=right data-sort-value="0.71" | 710 m || 
|-id=656 bgcolor=#fefefe
| 484656 ||  || — || October 6, 2008 || Kitt Peak || Spacewatch || MAS || align=right data-sort-value="0.75" | 750 m || 
|-id=657 bgcolor=#d6d6d6
| 484657 ||  || — || September 2, 2008 || Kitt Peak || Spacewatch || — || align=right | 4.2 km || 
|-id=658 bgcolor=#fefefe
| 484658 ||  || — || September 19, 2008 || Kitt Peak || Spacewatch || MAS || align=right data-sort-value="0.60" | 600 m || 
|-id=659 bgcolor=#fefefe
| 484659 ||  || — || October 10, 2008 || Kitt Peak || Spacewatch || NYS || align=right data-sort-value="0.66" | 660 m || 
|-id=660 bgcolor=#fefefe
| 484660 ||  || — || October 10, 2008 || Kitt Peak || Spacewatch || MAS || align=right data-sort-value="0.71" | 710 m || 
|-id=661 bgcolor=#fefefe
| 484661 ||  || — || September 24, 2008 || Mount Lemmon || Mount Lemmon Survey || V || align=right data-sort-value="0.55" | 550 m || 
|-id=662 bgcolor=#fefefe
| 484662 ||  || — || October 6, 2008 || Kitt Peak || Spacewatch || V || align=right data-sort-value="0.47" | 470 m || 
|-id=663 bgcolor=#fefefe
| 484663 ||  || — || September 22, 2008 || Mount Lemmon || Mount Lemmon Survey || — || align=right data-sort-value="0.65" | 650 m || 
|-id=664 bgcolor=#d6d6d6
| 484664 ||  || — || September 9, 2008 || Mount Lemmon || Mount Lemmon Survey || 7:4 || align=right | 3.1 km || 
|-id=665 bgcolor=#fefefe
| 484665 ||  || — || October 20, 2008 || Mount Lemmon || Mount Lemmon Survey || MAS || align=right data-sort-value="0.58" | 580 m || 
|-id=666 bgcolor=#fefefe
| 484666 ||  || — || October 20, 2008 || Kitt Peak || Spacewatch || (5026) || align=right | 1.6 km || 
|-id=667 bgcolor=#fefefe
| 484667 ||  || — || October 20, 2008 || Kitt Peak || Spacewatch || — || align=right data-sort-value="0.80" | 800 m || 
|-id=668 bgcolor=#fefefe
| 484668 ||  || — || October 21, 2008 || Kitt Peak || Spacewatch || — || align=right data-sort-value="0.81" | 810 m || 
|-id=669 bgcolor=#fefefe
| 484669 ||  || — || September 29, 2008 || Catalina || CSS || — || align=right | 1.1 km || 
|-id=670 bgcolor=#fefefe
| 484670 ||  || — || October 22, 2008 || Kitt Peak || Spacewatch || — || align=right data-sort-value="0.70" | 700 m || 
|-id=671 bgcolor=#d6d6d6
| 484671 ||  || — || October 2, 2008 || Kitt Peak || Spacewatch || 7:4 || align=right | 3.5 km || 
|-id=672 bgcolor=#fefefe
| 484672 ||  || — || October 20, 2008 || Kitt Peak || Spacewatch || — || align=right data-sort-value="0.65" | 650 m || 
|-id=673 bgcolor=#fefefe
| 484673 ||  || — || September 9, 2008 || Mount Lemmon || Mount Lemmon Survey || — || align=right data-sort-value="0.83" | 830 m || 
|-id=674 bgcolor=#fefefe
| 484674 ||  || — || October 22, 2008 || Kitt Peak || Spacewatch || — || align=right data-sort-value="0.99" | 990 m || 
|-id=675 bgcolor=#fefefe
| 484675 ||  || — || October 22, 2008 || Kitt Peak || Spacewatch || V || align=right data-sort-value="0.59" | 590 m || 
|-id=676 bgcolor=#fefefe
| 484676 ||  || — || October 23, 2008 || Kitt Peak || Spacewatch || — || align=right data-sort-value="0.65" | 650 m || 
|-id=677 bgcolor=#fefefe
| 484677 ||  || — || October 23, 2008 || Mount Lemmon || Mount Lemmon Survey || — || align=right data-sort-value="0.58" | 580 m || 
|-id=678 bgcolor=#fefefe
| 484678 ||  || — || October 23, 2008 || Mount Lemmon || Mount Lemmon Survey || NYS || align=right data-sort-value="0.63" | 630 m || 
|-id=679 bgcolor=#d6d6d6
| 484679 ||  || — || October 24, 2008 || Kitt Peak || Spacewatch || 7:4 || align=right | 3.2 km || 
|-id=680 bgcolor=#fefefe
| 484680 ||  || — || October 6, 2008 || Mount Lemmon || Mount Lemmon Survey || — || align=right data-sort-value="0.77" | 770 m || 
|-id=681 bgcolor=#fefefe
| 484681 ||  || — || October 24, 2008 || Mount Lemmon || Mount Lemmon Survey || — || align=right | 1.1 km || 
|-id=682 bgcolor=#fefefe
| 484682 ||  || — || October 24, 2008 || Kitt Peak || Spacewatch || MAS || align=right data-sort-value="0.71" | 710 m || 
|-id=683 bgcolor=#fefefe
| 484683 ||  || — || September 24, 2008 || Kitt Peak || Spacewatch || NYS || align=right data-sort-value="0.66" | 660 m || 
|-id=684 bgcolor=#fefefe
| 484684 ||  || — || October 23, 2008 || Kitt Peak || Spacewatch || NYS || align=right data-sort-value="0.51" | 510 m || 
|-id=685 bgcolor=#fefefe
| 484685 ||  || — || October 23, 2008 || Kitt Peak || Spacewatch || NYS || align=right data-sort-value="0.55" | 550 m || 
|-id=686 bgcolor=#fefefe
| 484686 ||  || — || October 24, 2008 || Kitt Peak || Spacewatch || — || align=right data-sort-value="0.83" | 830 m || 
|-id=687 bgcolor=#fefefe
| 484687 ||  || — || October 25, 2008 || Kitt Peak || Spacewatch || — || align=right data-sort-value="0.78" | 780 m || 
|-id=688 bgcolor=#fefefe
| 484688 ||  || — || October 25, 2008 || Kitt Peak || Spacewatch || — || align=right data-sort-value="0.75" | 750 m || 
|-id=689 bgcolor=#fefefe
| 484689 ||  || — || October 25, 2008 || Kitt Peak || Spacewatch || — || align=right data-sort-value="0.86" | 860 m || 
|-id=690 bgcolor=#d6d6d6
| 484690 ||  || — || October 25, 2008 || Kitt Peak || Spacewatch || 7:4 || align=right | 4.2 km || 
|-id=691 bgcolor=#fefefe
| 484691 ||  || — || October 25, 2008 || Kitt Peak || Spacewatch || — || align=right data-sort-value="0.72" | 720 m || 
|-id=692 bgcolor=#fefefe
| 484692 ||  || — || October 25, 2008 || Kitt Peak || Spacewatch || — || align=right data-sort-value="0.80" | 800 m || 
|-id=693 bgcolor=#fefefe
| 484693 ||  || — || October 27, 2008 || Kitt Peak || Spacewatch || — || align=right data-sort-value="0.62" | 620 m || 
|-id=694 bgcolor=#fefefe
| 484694 ||  || — || October 28, 2008 || Kitt Peak || Spacewatch || critical || align=right data-sort-value="0.78" | 780 m || 
|-id=695 bgcolor=#fefefe
| 484695 ||  || — || October 28, 2008 || Kitt Peak || Spacewatch || — || align=right data-sort-value="0.70" | 700 m || 
|-id=696 bgcolor=#E9E9E9
| 484696 ||  || — || October 28, 2008 || Kitt Peak || Spacewatch ||  || align=right | 1.2 km || 
|-id=697 bgcolor=#fefefe
| 484697 ||  || — || October 28, 2008 || Kitt Peak || Spacewatch || V || align=right data-sort-value="0.59" | 590 m || 
|-id=698 bgcolor=#fefefe
| 484698 ||  || — || October 20, 2008 || Kitt Peak || Spacewatch || — || align=right data-sort-value="0.94" | 940 m || 
|-id=699 bgcolor=#fefefe
| 484699 ||  || — || February 24, 2006 || Kitt Peak || Spacewatch || — || align=right data-sort-value="0.56" | 560 m || 
|-id=700 bgcolor=#fefefe
| 484700 ||  || — || October 29, 2008 || Kitt Peak || Spacewatch || — || align=right data-sort-value="0.72" | 720 m || 
|}

484701–484800 

|-bgcolor=#fefefe
| 484701 ||  || — || October 30, 2008 || Catalina || CSS || — || align=right data-sort-value="0.91" | 910 m || 
|-id=702 bgcolor=#fefefe
| 484702 ||  || — || October 23, 2008 || Kitt Peak || Spacewatch || NYS || align=right data-sort-value="0.55" | 550 m || 
|-id=703 bgcolor=#fefefe
| 484703 ||  || — || October 20, 2008 || Kitt Peak || Spacewatch || — || align=right data-sort-value="0.67" | 670 m || 
|-id=704 bgcolor=#fefefe
| 484704 ||  || — || October 25, 2008 || Mount Lemmon || Mount Lemmon Survey || V || align=right data-sort-value="0.56" | 560 m || 
|-id=705 bgcolor=#fefefe
| 484705 ||  || — || October 31, 2008 || Kitt Peak || Spacewatch || MAS || align=right data-sort-value="0.52" | 520 m || 
|-id=706 bgcolor=#fefefe
| 484706 ||  || — || October 26, 2008 || Kitt Peak || Spacewatch || — || align=right data-sort-value="0.73" | 730 m || 
|-id=707 bgcolor=#fefefe
| 484707 ||  || — || October 31, 2008 || Mount Lemmon || Mount Lemmon Survey || — || align=right data-sort-value="0.83" | 830 m || 
|-id=708 bgcolor=#E9E9E9
| 484708 ||  || — || November 2, 2008 || Mount Lemmon || Mount Lemmon Survey || — || align=right data-sort-value="0.85" | 850 m || 
|-id=709 bgcolor=#fefefe
| 484709 ||  || — || November 2, 2008 || Kitt Peak || Spacewatch || NYS || align=right data-sort-value="0.64" | 640 m || 
|-id=710 bgcolor=#fefefe
| 484710 ||  || — || October 29, 2008 || Mount Lemmon || Mount Lemmon Survey || H || align=right data-sort-value="0.56" | 560 m || 
|-id=711 bgcolor=#fefefe
| 484711 ||  || — || November 18, 2008 || Dauban || F. Kugel || — || align=right data-sort-value="0.71" | 710 m || 
|-id=712 bgcolor=#fefefe
| 484712 ||  || — || November 19, 2008 || Desert Moon || B. L. Stevens || — || align=right | 2.3 km || 
|-id=713 bgcolor=#fefefe
| 484713 ||  || — || September 22, 2008 || Mount Lemmon || Mount Lemmon Survey || — || align=right data-sort-value="0.78" | 780 m || 
|-id=714 bgcolor=#fefefe
| 484714 ||  || — || October 20, 2008 || Mount Lemmon || Mount Lemmon Survey || H || align=right data-sort-value="0.57" | 570 m || 
|-id=715 bgcolor=#fefefe
| 484715 ||  || — || November 17, 2008 || Kitt Peak || Spacewatch || MAS || align=right data-sort-value="0.54" | 540 m || 
|-id=716 bgcolor=#fefefe
| 484716 ||  || — || November 18, 2008 || Kitt Peak || Spacewatch || — || align=right data-sort-value="0.90" | 900 m || 
|-id=717 bgcolor=#fefefe
| 484717 ||  || — || November 17, 2008 || Kitt Peak || Spacewatch || — || align=right data-sort-value="0.92" | 920 m || 
|-id=718 bgcolor=#fefefe
| 484718 ||  || — || October 28, 2008 || Kitt Peak || Spacewatch || — || align=right data-sort-value="0.88" | 880 m || 
|-id=719 bgcolor=#fefefe
| 484719 ||  || — || November 19, 2008 || Kitt Peak || Spacewatch || H || align=right data-sort-value="0.69" | 690 m || 
|-id=720 bgcolor=#E9E9E9
| 484720 ||  || — || November 20, 2008 || Mount Lemmon || Mount Lemmon Survey || — || align=right | 1.2 km || 
|-id=721 bgcolor=#fefefe
| 484721 ||  || — || November 30, 2008 || Kitt Peak || Spacewatch || MAS || align=right data-sort-value="0.71" | 710 m || 
|-id=722 bgcolor=#fefefe
| 484722 ||  || — || November 30, 2008 || Catalina || CSS || H || align=right data-sort-value="0.75" | 750 m || 
|-id=723 bgcolor=#fefefe
| 484723 ||  || — || November 18, 2008 || Socorro || LINEAR || — || align=right data-sort-value="0.92" | 920 m || 
|-id=724 bgcolor=#fefefe
| 484724 ||  || — || March 20, 2004 || Siding Spring || SSS || H || align=right data-sort-value="0.54" | 540 m || 
|-id=725 bgcolor=#FFC2E0
| 484725 ||  || — || December 5, 2008 || Catalina || CSS || AMO || align=right data-sort-value="0.76" | 760 m || 
|-id=726 bgcolor=#fefefe
| 484726 ||  || — || December 9, 2008 || Great Shefford || P. Birtwhistle || — || align=right data-sort-value="0.78" | 780 m || 
|-id=727 bgcolor=#fefefe
| 484727 ||  || — || December 3, 2008 || Mount Lemmon || Mount Lemmon Survey || MAS || align=right data-sort-value="0.67" | 670 m || 
|-id=728 bgcolor=#fefefe
| 484728 ||  || — || November 19, 2008 || Kitt Peak || Spacewatch || — || align=right data-sort-value="0.71" | 710 m || 
|-id=729 bgcolor=#fefefe
| 484729 ||  || — || December 2, 2008 || Kitt Peak || Spacewatch || — || align=right data-sort-value="0.68" | 680 m || 
|-id=730 bgcolor=#fefefe
| 484730 ||  || — || December 2, 2008 || Mount Lemmon || Mount Lemmon Survey || H || align=right data-sort-value="0.62" | 620 m || 
|-id=731 bgcolor=#fefefe
| 484731 ||  || — || November 19, 2008 || Kitt Peak || Spacewatch || — || align=right data-sort-value="0.80" | 800 m || 
|-id=732 bgcolor=#E9E9E9
| 484732 ||  || — || December 4, 2008 || Mount Lemmon || Mount Lemmon Survey || — || align=right | 2.1 km || 
|-id=733 bgcolor=#fefefe
| 484733 ||  || — || December 5, 2008 || Mount Lemmon || Mount Lemmon Survey || H || align=right data-sort-value="0.59" | 590 m || 
|-id=734 bgcolor=#E9E9E9
| 484734 Chienshu ||  ||  || December 19, 2008 || Lulin || X. Y. Hsiao, Q.-z. Ye || RAF || align=right | 1.0 km || 
|-id=735 bgcolor=#E9E9E9
| 484735 ||  || — || November 7, 2008 || Mount Lemmon || Mount Lemmon Survey || — || align=right data-sort-value="0.95" | 950 m || 
|-id=736 bgcolor=#fefefe
| 484736 ||  || — || November 24, 2008 || Mount Lemmon || Mount Lemmon Survey || MAS || align=right data-sort-value="0.77" | 770 m || 
|-id=737 bgcolor=#E9E9E9
| 484737 ||  || — || November 23, 2008 || Mount Lemmon || Mount Lemmon Survey || EUN || align=right | 1.0 km || 
|-id=738 bgcolor=#E9E9E9
| 484738 ||  || — || December 22, 2008 || Mount Lemmon || Mount Lemmon Survey || — || align=right | 1.2 km || 
|-id=739 bgcolor=#E9E9E9
| 484739 ||  || — || December 4, 2008 || Mount Lemmon || Mount Lemmon Survey || — || align=right data-sort-value="0.91" | 910 m || 
|-id=740 bgcolor=#fefefe
| 484740 ||  || — || December 29, 2008 || Kitt Peak || Spacewatch || NYS || align=right data-sort-value="0.58" | 580 m || 
|-id=741 bgcolor=#E9E9E9
| 484741 ||  || — || December 21, 2008 || Kitt Peak || Spacewatch || — || align=right data-sort-value="0.91" | 910 m || 
|-id=742 bgcolor=#fefefe
| 484742 ||  || — || December 29, 2008 || Kitt Peak || Spacewatch || — || align=right data-sort-value="0.77" | 770 m || 
|-id=743 bgcolor=#fefefe
| 484743 ||  || — || December 21, 2008 || Kitt Peak || Spacewatch || — || align=right data-sort-value="0.94" | 940 m || 
|-id=744 bgcolor=#E9E9E9
| 484744 ||  || — || December 29, 2008 || Kitt Peak || Spacewatch || — || align=right data-sort-value="0.71" | 710 m || 
|-id=745 bgcolor=#fefefe
| 484745 ||  || — || December 21, 2008 || Catalina || CSS || H || align=right data-sort-value="0.88" | 880 m || 
|-id=746 bgcolor=#fefefe
| 484746 ||  || — || December 31, 2008 || Kitt Peak || Spacewatch || — || align=right data-sort-value="0.73" | 730 m || 
|-id=747 bgcolor=#fefefe
| 484747 ||  || — || December 30, 2008 || Kitt Peak || Spacewatch || NYS || align=right data-sort-value="0.72" | 720 m || 
|-id=748 bgcolor=#E9E9E9
| 484748 ||  || — || December 30, 2008 || Kitt Peak || Spacewatch || — || align=right data-sort-value="0.81" | 810 m || 
|-id=749 bgcolor=#E9E9E9
| 484749 ||  || — || December 30, 2008 || Kitt Peak || Spacewatch || — || align=right data-sort-value="0.81" | 810 m || 
|-id=750 bgcolor=#fefefe
| 484750 ||  || — || December 22, 2008 || Kitt Peak || Spacewatch || — || align=right data-sort-value="0.69" | 690 m || 
|-id=751 bgcolor=#fefefe
| 484751 ||  || — || December 22, 2008 || Kitt Peak || Spacewatch || — || align=right data-sort-value="0.78" | 780 m || 
|-id=752 bgcolor=#fefefe
| 484752 ||  || — || December 31, 2008 || Kitt Peak || Spacewatch || — || align=right data-sort-value="0.97" | 970 m || 
|-id=753 bgcolor=#fefefe
| 484753 ||  || — || December 29, 2008 || Mount Lemmon || Mount Lemmon Survey || H || align=right data-sort-value="0.58" | 580 m || 
|-id=754 bgcolor=#fefefe
| 484754 ||  || — || December 22, 2008 || Kitt Peak || Spacewatch || — || align=right data-sort-value="0.80" | 800 m || 
|-id=755 bgcolor=#fefefe
| 484755 ||  || — || January 2, 2009 || Mount Lemmon || Mount Lemmon Survey || — || align=right | 1.1 km || 
|-id=756 bgcolor=#fefefe
| 484756 ||  || — || December 22, 2008 || Kitt Peak || Spacewatch || H || align=right data-sort-value="0.65" | 650 m || 
|-id=757 bgcolor=#FFC2E0
| 484757 ||  || — || January 18, 2009 || Socorro || LINEAR || APO || align=right data-sort-value="0.49" | 490 m || 
|-id=758 bgcolor=#E9E9E9
| 484758 ||  || — || January 16, 2009 || Kitt Peak || Spacewatch || EUN || align=right | 1.0 km || 
|-id=759 bgcolor=#E9E9E9
| 484759 ||  || — || January 1, 2009 || Mount Lemmon || Mount Lemmon Survey || — || align=right data-sort-value="0.89" | 890 m || 
|-id=760 bgcolor=#E9E9E9
| 484760 ||  || — || December 22, 2008 || Mount Lemmon || Mount Lemmon Survey || — || align=right data-sort-value="0.72" | 720 m || 
|-id=761 bgcolor=#E9E9E9
| 484761 ||  || — || January 16, 2009 || Kitt Peak || Spacewatch || — || align=right | 1.6 km || 
|-id=762 bgcolor=#E9E9E9
| 484762 ||  || — || December 22, 2008 || Kitt Peak || Spacewatch || — || align=right data-sort-value="0.85" | 850 m || 
|-id=763 bgcolor=#fefefe
| 484763 ||  || — || January 16, 2009 || Mount Lemmon || Mount Lemmon Survey || NYS || align=right data-sort-value="0.68" | 680 m || 
|-id=764 bgcolor=#fefefe
| 484764 ||  || — || January 2, 2009 || Mount Lemmon || Mount Lemmon Survey || — || align=right data-sort-value="0.94" | 940 m || 
|-id=765 bgcolor=#E9E9E9
| 484765 ||  || — || January 16, 2009 || Kitt Peak || Spacewatch || — || align=right | 1.0 km || 
|-id=766 bgcolor=#fefefe
| 484766 ||  || — || November 20, 2008 || Mount Lemmon || Mount Lemmon Survey || H || align=right data-sort-value="0.71" | 710 m || 
|-id=767 bgcolor=#E9E9E9
| 484767 ||  || — || January 20, 2009 || Kitt Peak || Spacewatch || — || align=right | 1.1 km || 
|-id=768 bgcolor=#E9E9E9
| 484768 ||  || — || January 20, 2009 || Kitt Peak || Spacewatch || — || align=right data-sort-value="0.73" | 730 m || 
|-id=769 bgcolor=#E9E9E9
| 484769 ||  || — || January 16, 2009 || Kitt Peak || Spacewatch || — || align=right | 1.7 km || 
|-id=770 bgcolor=#E9E9E9
| 484770 ||  || — || January 15, 2009 || Kitt Peak || Spacewatch || — || align=right data-sort-value="0.94" | 940 m || 
|-id=771 bgcolor=#E9E9E9
| 484771 ||  || — || January 30, 2009 || Kitt Peak || Spacewatch || RAF || align=right data-sort-value="0.83" | 830 m || 
|-id=772 bgcolor=#E9E9E9
| 484772 ||  || — || March 11, 2005 || Mount Lemmon || Mount Lemmon Survey || — || align=right | 1.3 km || 
|-id=773 bgcolor=#fefefe
| 484773 ||  || — || January 20, 2009 || Kitt Peak || Spacewatch || NYS || align=right data-sort-value="0.56" | 560 m || 
|-id=774 bgcolor=#E9E9E9
| 484774 ||  || — || January 31, 2009 || Kitt Peak || Spacewatch || — || align=right data-sort-value="0.66" | 660 m || 
|-id=775 bgcolor=#E9E9E9
| 484775 ||  || — || January 31, 2009 || Kitt Peak || Spacewatch || critical || align=right data-sort-value="0.90" | 900 m || 
|-id=776 bgcolor=#E9E9E9
| 484776 ||  || — || January 31, 2009 || Kitt Peak || Spacewatch || — || align=right | 1.0 km || 
|-id=777 bgcolor=#E9E9E9
| 484777 ||  || — || January 20, 2009 || Kitt Peak || Spacewatch || — || align=right data-sort-value="0.80" | 800 m || 
|-id=778 bgcolor=#E9E9E9
| 484778 ||  || — || January 20, 2009 || Kitt Peak || Spacewatch || (5) || align=right data-sort-value="0.57" | 570 m || 
|-id=779 bgcolor=#E9E9E9
| 484779 ||  || — || January 17, 2009 || Kitt Peak || Spacewatch || — || align=right data-sort-value="0.97" | 970 m || 
|-id=780 bgcolor=#FA8072
| 484780 ||  || — || January 29, 2009 || Catalina || CSS || H || align=right data-sort-value="0.57" | 570 m || 
|-id=781 bgcolor=#fefefe
| 484781 ||  || — || January 31, 2009 || Mount Lemmon || Mount Lemmon Survey || H || align=right data-sort-value="0.61" | 610 m || 
|-id=782 bgcolor=#E9E9E9
| 484782 ||  || — || January 20, 2009 || Mount Lemmon || Mount Lemmon Survey || — || align=right data-sort-value="0.88" | 880 m || 
|-id=783 bgcolor=#fefefe
| 484783 ||  || — || February 2, 2009 || Mount Lemmon || Mount Lemmon Survey || H || align=right data-sort-value="0.74" | 740 m || 
|-id=784 bgcolor=#fefefe
| 484784 ||  || — || February 1, 2009 || Catalina || CSS || H || align=right data-sort-value="0.85" | 850 m || 
|-id=785 bgcolor=#E9E9E9
| 484785 ||  || — || February 3, 2009 || Mount Lemmon || Mount Lemmon Survey || MAR || align=right data-sort-value="0.84" | 840 m || 
|-id=786 bgcolor=#fefefe
| 484786 ||  || — || February 1, 2009 || Mount Lemmon || Mount Lemmon Survey || — || align=right data-sort-value="0.78" | 780 m || 
|-id=787 bgcolor=#fefefe
| 484787 ||  || — || February 1, 2009 || Kitt Peak || Spacewatch || H || align=right data-sort-value="0.68" | 680 m || 
|-id=788 bgcolor=#E9E9E9
| 484788 ||  || — || February 3, 2009 || Kitt Peak || Spacewatch || — || align=right data-sort-value="0.74" | 740 m || 
|-id=789 bgcolor=#E9E9E9
| 484789 ||  || — || February 3, 2009 || Kitt Peak || Spacewatch || — || align=right data-sort-value="0.82" | 820 m || 
|-id=790 bgcolor=#E9E9E9
| 484790 ||  || — || January 25, 2009 || Kitt Peak || Spacewatch || ADE || align=right | 1.7 km || 
|-id=791 bgcolor=#E9E9E9
| 484791 ||  || — || February 18, 2009 || Taunus || E. Schwab, R. Kling || KON || align=right | 2.4 km || 
|-id=792 bgcolor=#E9E9E9
| 484792 ||  || — || February 16, 2009 || Dauban || F. Kugel || — || align=right | 1.1 km || 
|-id=793 bgcolor=#fefefe
| 484793 ||  || — || February 4, 2009 || Mount Lemmon || Mount Lemmon Survey || H || align=right data-sort-value="0.68" | 680 m || 
|-id=794 bgcolor=#E9E9E9
| 484794 ||  || — || February 21, 2009 || Kitt Peak || Spacewatch || — || align=right data-sort-value="0.75" | 750 m || 
|-id=795 bgcolor=#FFC2E0
| 484795 ||  || — || February 28, 2009 || Socorro || LINEAR || APO || align=right data-sort-value="0.71" | 710 m || 
|-id=796 bgcolor=#E9E9E9
| 484796 ||  || — || January 18, 2009 || Mount Lemmon || Mount Lemmon Survey || — || align=right | 1.2 km || 
|-id=797 bgcolor=#E9E9E9
| 484797 ||  || — || February 24, 2009 || La Sagra || OAM Obs. || — || align=right | 1.1 km || 
|-id=798 bgcolor=#E9E9E9
| 484798 ||  || — || January 18, 2009 || Mount Lemmon || Mount Lemmon Survey || — || align=right | 2.4 km || 
|-id=799 bgcolor=#E9E9E9
| 484799 ||  || — || February 27, 2009 || Catalina || CSS || — || align=right | 1.1 km || 
|-id=800 bgcolor=#E9E9E9
| 484800 ||  || — || November 24, 2008 || Mount Lemmon || Mount Lemmon Survey || — || align=right | 1.6 km || 
|}

484801–484900 

|-bgcolor=#E9E9E9
| 484801 ||  || — || February 26, 2009 || Kitt Peak || Spacewatch || — || align=right data-sort-value="0.80" | 800 m || 
|-id=802 bgcolor=#E9E9E9
| 484802 ||  || — || February 19, 2009 || Kitt Peak || Spacewatch || — || align=right data-sort-value="0.87" | 870 m || 
|-id=803 bgcolor=#E9E9E9
| 484803 ||  || — || February 19, 2009 || Kitt Peak || Spacewatch || — || align=right | 1.1 km || 
|-id=804 bgcolor=#E9E9E9
| 484804 ||  || — || February 20, 2009 || Kitt Peak || Spacewatch || MAR || align=right | 1.2 km || 
|-id=805 bgcolor=#fefefe
| 484805 ||  || — || February 20, 2009 || Kitt Peak || Spacewatch || H || align=right data-sort-value="0.62" | 620 m || 
|-id=806 bgcolor=#E9E9E9
| 484806 ||  || — || February 19, 2009 || Kitt Peak || Spacewatch || — || align=right data-sort-value="0.65" | 650 m || 
|-id=807 bgcolor=#E9E9E9
| 484807 ||  || — || February 20, 2009 || Mount Lemmon || Mount Lemmon Survey || — || align=right data-sort-value="0.83" | 830 m || 
|-id=808 bgcolor=#E9E9E9
| 484808 ||  || — || February 19, 2009 || Kitt Peak || Spacewatch || critical || align=right data-sort-value="0.71" | 710 m || 
|-id=809 bgcolor=#E9E9E9
| 484809 ||  || — || March 1, 2009 || Kitt Peak || Spacewatch || — || align=right data-sort-value="0.85" | 850 m || 
|-id=810 bgcolor=#E9E9E9
| 484810 ||  || — || March 2, 2009 || Mount Lemmon || Mount Lemmon Survey || EUN || align=right | 1.3 km || 
|-id=811 bgcolor=#E9E9E9
| 484811 ||  || — || February 19, 2009 || Kitt Peak || Spacewatch || — || align=right data-sort-value="0.67" | 670 m || 
|-id=812 bgcolor=#E9E9E9
| 484812 ||  || — || March 15, 2009 || Kitt Peak || Spacewatch || — || align=right | 1.4 km || 
|-id=813 bgcolor=#E9E9E9
| 484813 ||  || — || March 1, 2009 || Kitt Peak || Spacewatch || — || align=right | 1.1 km || 
|-id=814 bgcolor=#fefefe
| 484814 ||  || — || March 17, 2009 || La Sagra || OAM Obs. || H || align=right data-sort-value="0.69" | 690 m || 
|-id=815 bgcolor=#E9E9E9
| 484815 ||  || — || March 22, 2009 || La Sagra || OAM Obs. || — || align=right | 1.8 km || 
|-id=816 bgcolor=#E9E9E9
| 484816 ||  || — || March 22, 2009 || Catalina || CSS || JUN || align=right | 1.00 km || 
|-id=817 bgcolor=#E9E9E9
| 484817 ||  || — || March 1, 2009 || Kitt Peak || Spacewatch || — || align=right data-sort-value="0.89" | 890 m || 
|-id=818 bgcolor=#E9E9E9
| 484818 ||  || — || March 24, 2009 || Mount Lemmon || Mount Lemmon Survey || — || align=right data-sort-value="0.80" | 800 m || 
|-id=819 bgcolor=#E9E9E9
| 484819 ||  || — || March 28, 2009 || Mount Lemmon || Mount Lemmon Survey || GEF || align=right | 1.2 km || 
|-id=820 bgcolor=#E9E9E9
| 484820 ||  || — || March 29, 2009 || Mount Lemmon || Mount Lemmon Survey || — || align=right | 1.3 km || 
|-id=821 bgcolor=#E9E9E9
| 484821 ||  || — || March 21, 2009 || Kitt Peak || Spacewatch || KON || align=right | 1.8 km || 
|-id=822 bgcolor=#E9E9E9
| 484822 ||  || — || March 18, 2009 || Kitt Peak || Spacewatch || — || align=right | 1.5 km || 
|-id=823 bgcolor=#E9E9E9
| 484823 ||  || — || March 24, 2009 || Mount Lemmon || Mount Lemmon Survey || — || align=right data-sort-value="0.83" | 830 m || 
|-id=824 bgcolor=#E9E9E9
| 484824 ||  || — || March 18, 2009 || Mount Lemmon || Mount Lemmon Survey || — || align=right | 1.3 km || 
|-id=825 bgcolor=#E9E9E9
| 484825 ||  || — || April 15, 2009 || Siding Spring || SSS || — || align=right data-sort-value="0.79" | 790 m || 
|-id=826 bgcolor=#E9E9E9
| 484826 ||  || — || April 2, 2009 || Kitt Peak || Spacewatch || — || align=right data-sort-value="0.76" | 760 m || 
|-id=827 bgcolor=#fefefe
| 484827 ||  || — || April 2, 2009 || Catalina || CSS || H || align=right data-sort-value="0.78" | 780 m || 
|-id=828 bgcolor=#E9E9E9
| 484828 ||  || — || April 17, 2009 || Kitt Peak || Spacewatch || (5) || align=right data-sort-value="0.60" | 600 m || 
|-id=829 bgcolor=#E9E9E9
| 484829 ||  || — || April 2, 2009 || Mount Lemmon || Mount Lemmon Survey || — || align=right | 1.5 km || 
|-id=830 bgcolor=#fefefe
| 484830 ||  || — || March 18, 2009 || Socorro || LINEAR || H || align=right data-sort-value="0.76" | 760 m || 
|-id=831 bgcolor=#E9E9E9
| 484831 ||  || — || April 17, 2009 || Kitt Peak || Spacewatch || — || align=right data-sort-value="0.81" | 810 m || 
|-id=832 bgcolor=#E9E9E9
| 484832 ||  || — || April 17, 2009 || Kitt Peak || Spacewatch || — || align=right | 1.4 km || 
|-id=833 bgcolor=#E9E9E9
| 484833 ||  || — || April 2, 2009 || Mount Lemmon || Mount Lemmon Survey || — || align=right | 1.4 km || 
|-id=834 bgcolor=#E9E9E9
| 484834 ||  || — || April 17, 2009 || Kitt Peak || Spacewatch || — || align=right | 1.9 km || 
|-id=835 bgcolor=#E9E9E9
| 484835 ||  || — || March 24, 2009 || Mount Lemmon || Mount Lemmon Survey || — || align=right data-sort-value="0.85" | 850 m || 
|-id=836 bgcolor=#E9E9E9
| 484836 ||  || — || April 20, 2009 || Kitt Peak || Spacewatch || — || align=right | 1.9 km || 
|-id=837 bgcolor=#E9E9E9
| 484837 ||  || — || March 24, 2009 || Mount Lemmon || Mount Lemmon Survey || — || align=right | 2.5 km || 
|-id=838 bgcolor=#E9E9E9
| 484838 ||  || — || April 21, 2009 || Kitt Peak || Spacewatch || — || align=right data-sort-value="0.95" | 950 m || 
|-id=839 bgcolor=#E9E9E9
| 484839 ||  || — || April 17, 2009 || Kitt Peak || Spacewatch || — || align=right | 1.2 km || 
|-id=840 bgcolor=#E9E9E9
| 484840 ||  || — || April 20, 2009 || Mount Lemmon || Mount Lemmon Survey || — || align=right data-sort-value="0.80" | 800 m || 
|-id=841 bgcolor=#fefefe
| 484841 ||  || — || April 2, 2009 || Mount Lemmon || Mount Lemmon Survey || H || align=right data-sort-value="0.63" | 630 m || 
|-id=842 bgcolor=#E9E9E9
| 484842 ||  || — || April 22, 2009 || Kitt Peak || Spacewatch || ADE || align=right | 1.7 km || 
|-id=843 bgcolor=#E9E9E9
| 484843 ||  || — || April 23, 2009 || Kitt Peak || Spacewatch || — || align=right data-sort-value="0.90" | 900 m || 
|-id=844 bgcolor=#E9E9E9
| 484844 ||  || — || April 22, 2009 || Mount Lemmon || Mount Lemmon Survey || — || align=right data-sort-value="0.75" | 750 m || 
|-id=845 bgcolor=#fefefe
| 484845 ||  || — || April 2, 2009 || Kitt Peak || Spacewatch || H || align=right data-sort-value="0.68" | 680 m || 
|-id=846 bgcolor=#E9E9E9
| 484846 ||  || — || April 19, 2009 || Mount Lemmon || Mount Lemmon Survey || — || align=right data-sort-value="0.89" | 890 m || 
|-id=847 bgcolor=#E9E9E9
| 484847 ||  || — || March 25, 2009 || Mount Lemmon || Mount Lemmon Survey || — || align=right | 1.3 km || 
|-id=848 bgcolor=#E9E9E9
| 484848 ||  || — || April 19, 2009 || Kitt Peak || Spacewatch || — || align=right | 2.3 km || 
|-id=849 bgcolor=#E9E9E9
| 484849 ||  || — || April 18, 2009 || Kitt Peak || Spacewatch || — || align=right | 1.5 km || 
|-id=850 bgcolor=#FFC2E0
| 484850 ||  || — || April 30, 2009 || Kitt Peak || Spacewatch || AMOcritical || align=right data-sort-value="0.49" | 490 m || 
|-id=851 bgcolor=#E9E9E9
| 484851 ||  || — || April 21, 2009 || Kitt Peak || Spacewatch || — || align=right | 1.4 km || 
|-id=852 bgcolor=#E9E9E9
| 484852 ||  || — || March 31, 2009 || Mount Lemmon || Mount Lemmon Survey || — || align=right data-sort-value="0.86" | 860 m || 
|-id=853 bgcolor=#E9E9E9
| 484853 ||  || — || April 27, 2009 || Kitt Peak || Spacewatch || — || align=right | 2.0 km || 
|-id=854 bgcolor=#E9E9E9
| 484854 ||  || — || April 27, 2009 || Kitt Peak || Spacewatch || — || align=right data-sort-value="0.81" | 810 m || 
|-id=855 bgcolor=#E9E9E9
| 484855 ||  || — || April 21, 2009 || Mount Lemmon || Mount Lemmon Survey || — || align=right data-sort-value="0.99" | 990 m || 
|-id=856 bgcolor=#E9E9E9
| 484856 ||  || — || April 24, 2009 || Kitt Peak || Spacewatch || EUN || align=right | 1.1 km || 
|-id=857 bgcolor=#E9E9E9
| 484857 ||  || — || May 13, 2009 || Kitt Peak || Spacewatch || — || align=right | 1.8 km || 
|-id=858 bgcolor=#E9E9E9
| 484858 ||  || — || February 20, 2009 || Mount Lemmon || Mount Lemmon Survey || EUN || align=right | 1.00 km || 
|-id=859 bgcolor=#E9E9E9
| 484859 ||  || — || May 2, 2009 || La Sagra || OAM Obs. || — || align=right | 1.5 km || 
|-id=860 bgcolor=#E9E9E9
| 484860 ||  || — || December 3, 2008 || Mount Lemmon || Mount Lemmon Survey || — || align=right | 2.1 km || 
|-id=861 bgcolor=#FA8072
| 484861 ||  || — || May 26, 2009 || Siding Spring || SSS || — || align=right | 1.3 km || 
|-id=862 bgcolor=#E9E9E9
| 484862 ||  || — || May 24, 2009 || Catalina || CSS || — || align=right | 1.8 km || 
|-id=863 bgcolor=#E9E9E9
| 484863 ||  || — || May 1, 2009 || Kitt Peak || Spacewatch || — || align=right | 2.1 km || 
|-id=864 bgcolor=#E9E9E9
| 484864 ||  || — || April 22, 2009 || Mount Lemmon || Mount Lemmon Survey || — || align=right | 1.3 km || 
|-id=865 bgcolor=#d6d6d6
| 484865 ||  || — || July 12, 2009 || Kitt Peak || Spacewatch || BRA || align=right | 1.7 km || 
|-id=866 bgcolor=#d6d6d6
| 484866 ||  || — || July 16, 2009 || La Sagra || OAM Obs. || — || align=right | 3.0 km || 
|-id=867 bgcolor=#E9E9E9
| 484867 ||  || — || July 19, 2009 || La Sagra || OAM Obs. || JUN || align=right data-sort-value="0.90" | 900 m || 
|-id=868 bgcolor=#d6d6d6
| 484868 ||  || — || July 25, 2009 || La Sagra || OAM Obs. || — || align=right | 3.8 km || 
|-id=869 bgcolor=#d6d6d6
| 484869 ||  || — || July 28, 2009 || La Sagra || OAM Obs. || — || align=right | 3.1 km || 
|-id=870 bgcolor=#E9E9E9
| 484870 ||  || — || July 27, 2009 || Catalina || CSS || JUN || align=right | 1.0 km || 
|-id=871 bgcolor=#d6d6d6
| 484871 ||  || — || July 28, 2009 || La Sagra || OAM Obs. || — || align=right | 3.7 km || 
|-id=872 bgcolor=#E9E9E9
| 484872 ||  || — || July 25, 2009 || La Sagra || OAM Obs. || — || align=right | 3.0 km || 
|-id=873 bgcolor=#d6d6d6
| 484873 ||  || — || July 28, 2009 || Kitt Peak || Spacewatch || — || align=right | 2.6 km || 
|-id=874 bgcolor=#d6d6d6
| 484874 ||  || — || July 14, 2009 || Kitt Peak || Spacewatch || — || align=right | 2.1 km || 
|-id=875 bgcolor=#d6d6d6
| 484875 ||  || — || July 28, 2009 || Kitt Peak || Spacewatch || — || align=right | 3.1 km || 
|-id=876 bgcolor=#E9E9E9
| 484876 ||  || — || August 14, 2009 || La Sagra || OAM Obs. || — || align=right | 2.5 km || 
|-id=877 bgcolor=#d6d6d6
| 484877 ||  || — || August 15, 2009 || La Sagra || OAM Obs. || — || align=right | 2.9 km || 
|-id=878 bgcolor=#d6d6d6
| 484878 ||  || — || August 15, 2009 || Kitt Peak || Spacewatch || — || align=right | 2.2 km || 
|-id=879 bgcolor=#d6d6d6
| 484879 ||  || — || August 15, 2009 || Kitt Peak || Spacewatch || — || align=right | 2.7 km || 
|-id=880 bgcolor=#E9E9E9
| 484880 ||  || — || August 16, 2009 || Kitt Peak || Spacewatch || — || align=right | 2.4 km || 
|-id=881 bgcolor=#E9E9E9
| 484881 ||  || — || August 16, 2009 || Kitt Peak || Spacewatch || — || align=right | 1.9 km || 
|-id=882 bgcolor=#d6d6d6
| 484882 ||  || — || August 21, 2009 || La Sagra || OAM Obs. || — || align=right | 3.6 km || 
|-id=883 bgcolor=#d6d6d6
| 484883 ||  || — || August 24, 2009 || La Sagra || OAM Obs. || — || align=right | 3.6 km || 
|-id=884 bgcolor=#d6d6d6
| 484884 ||  || — || August 28, 2009 || La Sagra || OAM Obs. || — || align=right | 2.5 km || 
|-id=885 bgcolor=#d6d6d6
| 484885 ||  || — || August 26, 2009 || La Sagra || OAM Obs. || — || align=right | 3.9 km || 
|-id=886 bgcolor=#d6d6d6
| 484886 ||  || — || August 20, 2009 || La Sagra || OAM Obs. || EOS || align=right | 1.4 km || 
|-id=887 bgcolor=#d6d6d6
| 484887 ||  || — || August 26, 2009 || La Sagra || OAM Obs. || — || align=right | 3.0 km || 
|-id=888 bgcolor=#d6d6d6
| 484888 ||  || — || August 28, 2009 || La Sagra || OAM Obs. || EOS || align=right | 2.0 km || 
|-id=889 bgcolor=#d6d6d6
| 484889 ||  || — || August 28, 2009 || La Sagra || OAM Obs. || — || align=right | 3.4 km || 
|-id=890 bgcolor=#d6d6d6
| 484890 ||  || — || August 27, 2009 || La Sagra || OAM Obs. || — || align=right | 3.1 km || 
|-id=891 bgcolor=#d6d6d6
| 484891 ||  || — || August 16, 2009 || Kitt Peak || Spacewatch || — || align=right | 2.4 km || 
|-id=892 bgcolor=#d6d6d6
| 484892 ||  || — || August 29, 2009 || La Sagra || OAM Obs. || — || align=right | 3.3 km || 
|-id=893 bgcolor=#d6d6d6
| 484893 ||  || — || August 16, 2009 || Catalina || CSS || — || align=right | 3.5 km || 
|-id=894 bgcolor=#d6d6d6
| 484894 ||  || — || August 17, 2009 || Catalina || CSS || — || align=right | 3.4 km || 
|-id=895 bgcolor=#d6d6d6
| 484895 ||  || — || August 19, 2009 || La Sagra || OAM Obs. || — || align=right | 2.1 km || 
|-id=896 bgcolor=#d6d6d6
| 484896 ||  || — || August 29, 2009 || La Sagra || OAM Obs. || — || align=right | 4.5 km || 
|-id=897 bgcolor=#d6d6d6
| 484897 ||  || — || August 28, 2009 || Catalina || CSS || — || align=right | 2.8 km || 
|-id=898 bgcolor=#d6d6d6
| 484898 ||  || — || September 10, 2009 || La Sagra || OAM Obs. || TIR || align=right | 3.6 km || 
|-id=899 bgcolor=#d6d6d6
| 484899 ||  || — || September 12, 2009 || Kitt Peak || Spacewatch || EOS || align=right | 1.8 km || 
|-id=900 bgcolor=#d6d6d6
| 484900 ||  || — || September 12, 2009 || Kitt Peak || Spacewatch || — || align=right | 2.6 km || 
|}

484901–485000 

|-bgcolor=#d6d6d6
| 484901 ||  || — || September 12, 2009 || Kitt Peak || Spacewatch || — || align=right | 2.5 km || 
|-id=902 bgcolor=#d6d6d6
| 484902 ||  || — || September 12, 2009 || Kitt Peak || Spacewatch ||  || align=right | 2.3 km || 
|-id=903 bgcolor=#d6d6d6
| 484903 ||  || — || September 14, 2009 || Kitt Peak || Spacewatch || — || align=right | 3.6 km || 
|-id=904 bgcolor=#d6d6d6
| 484904 ||  || — || September 15, 2009 || Kitt Peak || Spacewatch || — || align=right | 3.1 km || 
|-id=905 bgcolor=#d6d6d6
| 484905 ||  || — || September 15, 2009 || Kitt Peak || Spacewatch || 7:4 || align=right | 3.4 km || 
|-id=906 bgcolor=#d6d6d6
| 484906 ||  || — || September 15, 2009 || Kitt Peak || Spacewatch || — || align=right | 2.3 km || 
|-id=907 bgcolor=#fefefe
| 484907 ||  || — || September 15, 2009 || Kitt Peak || Spacewatch || — || align=right data-sort-value="0.95" | 950 m || 
|-id=908 bgcolor=#fefefe
| 484908 ||  || — || September 14, 2009 || Kitt Peak || Spacewatch || — || align=right data-sort-value="0.67" | 670 m || 
|-id=909 bgcolor=#fefefe
| 484909 ||  || — || September 14, 2009 || Kitt Peak || Spacewatch || — || align=right data-sort-value="0.68" | 680 m || 
|-id=910 bgcolor=#d6d6d6
| 484910 ||  || — || September 15, 2009 || Kitt Peak || Spacewatch || — || align=right | 4.4 km || 
|-id=911 bgcolor=#d6d6d6
| 484911 ||  || — || August 17, 2009 || Kitt Peak || Spacewatch || LIX || align=right | 3.5 km || 
|-id=912 bgcolor=#d6d6d6
| 484912 ||  || — || August 16, 2009 || Catalina || CSS || — || align=right | 2.9 km || 
|-id=913 bgcolor=#fefefe
| 484913 ||  || — || September 18, 2009 || XuYi || PMO NEO || — || align=right data-sort-value="0.94" | 940 m || 
|-id=914 bgcolor=#d6d6d6
| 484914 ||  || — || August 17, 2009 || Kitt Peak || Spacewatch || — || align=right | 3.5 km || 
|-id=915 bgcolor=#d6d6d6
| 484915 ||  || — || July 27, 2009 || Kitt Peak || Spacewatch || LIX || align=right | 2.6 km || 
|-id=916 bgcolor=#d6d6d6
| 484916 ||  || — || September 16, 2009 || Kitt Peak || Spacewatch || Tj (2.99) || align=right | 3.3 km || 
|-id=917 bgcolor=#d6d6d6
| 484917 ||  || — || September 16, 2009 || Kitt Peak || Spacewatch || — || align=right | 2.5 km || 
|-id=918 bgcolor=#d6d6d6
| 484918 ||  || — || September 16, 2009 || Kitt Peak || Spacewatch || — || align=right | 3.7 km || 
|-id=919 bgcolor=#d6d6d6
| 484919 ||  || — || August 16, 2009 || Kitt Peak || Spacewatch || EOS || align=right | 1.9 km || 
|-id=920 bgcolor=#d6d6d6
| 484920 ||  || — || September 17, 2009 || Kitt Peak || Spacewatch || — || align=right | 3.3 km || 
|-id=921 bgcolor=#d6d6d6
| 484921 ||  || — || September 17, 2009 || Kitt Peak || Spacewatch || — || align=right | 2.4 km || 
|-id=922 bgcolor=#d6d6d6
| 484922 ||  || — || September 17, 2009 || Mount Lemmon || Mount Lemmon Survey || EOS || align=right | 1.6 km || 
|-id=923 bgcolor=#d6d6d6
| 484923 ||  || — || September 17, 2009 || Kitt Peak || Spacewatch || — || align=right | 4.3 km || 
|-id=924 bgcolor=#d6d6d6
| 484924 ||  || — || August 19, 2009 || Catalina || CSS || Tj (2.99) || align=right | 3.6 km || 
|-id=925 bgcolor=#fefefe
| 484925 ||  || — || September 25, 2009 || La Sagra || OAM Obs. || — || align=right | 1.3 km || 
|-id=926 bgcolor=#d6d6d6
| 484926 ||  || — || September 17, 2009 || La Sagra || OAM Obs. || — || align=right | 4.1 km || 
|-id=927 bgcolor=#d6d6d6
| 484927 ||  || — || September 10, 2009 || Catalina || CSS || — || align=right | 3.5 km || 
|-id=928 bgcolor=#d6d6d6
| 484928 ||  || — || September 18, 2009 || Kitt Peak || Spacewatch || — || align=right | 2.3 km || 
|-id=929 bgcolor=#d6d6d6
| 484929 ||  || — || February 25, 2007 || Kitt Peak || Spacewatch || — || align=right | 2.4 km || 
|-id=930 bgcolor=#d6d6d6
| 484930 ||  || — || September 13, 1998 || Kitt Peak || Spacewatch || — || align=right | 2.2 km || 
|-id=931 bgcolor=#d6d6d6
| 484931 ||  || — || September 18, 2009 || Kitt Peak || Spacewatch || — || align=right | 2.2 km || 
|-id=932 bgcolor=#fefefe
| 484932 ||  || — || September 19, 2009 || Kitt Peak || Spacewatch || — || align=right data-sort-value="0.52" | 520 m || 
|-id=933 bgcolor=#d6d6d6
| 484933 ||  || — || September 19, 2009 || Kitt Peak || Spacewatch || EOS || align=right | 2.3 km || 
|-id=934 bgcolor=#d6d6d6
| 484934 ||  || — || August 29, 2009 || La Sagra || OAM Obs. || LIX || align=right | 3.9 km || 
|-id=935 bgcolor=#d6d6d6
| 484935 ||  || — || September 20, 2009 || Kitt Peak || Spacewatch || — || align=right | 2.2 km || 
|-id=936 bgcolor=#d6d6d6
| 484936 ||  || — || September 21, 2009 || Mount Lemmon || Mount Lemmon Survey || — || align=right | 3.2 km || 
|-id=937 bgcolor=#d6d6d6
| 484937 ||  || — || August 19, 2009 || Kitt Peak || Spacewatch || — || align=right | 2.8 km || 
|-id=938 bgcolor=#d6d6d6
| 484938 ||  || — || September 12, 2009 || Kitt Peak || Spacewatch || — || align=right | 3.4 km || 
|-id=939 bgcolor=#d6d6d6
| 484939 ||  || — || September 20, 2009 || Kitt Peak || Spacewatch || — || align=right | 2.6 km || 
|-id=940 bgcolor=#d6d6d6
| 484940 ||  || — || September 21, 2009 || Mount Lemmon || Mount Lemmon Survey || — || align=right | 2.3 km || 
|-id=941 bgcolor=#d6d6d6
| 484941 ||  || — || September 21, 2009 || Kitt Peak || Spacewatch || EOS || align=right | 1.9 km || 
|-id=942 bgcolor=#d6d6d6
| 484942 ||  || — || January 23, 2006 || Kitt Peak || Spacewatch || — || align=right | 2.4 km || 
|-id=943 bgcolor=#d6d6d6
| 484943 ||  || — || September 22, 2009 || Kitt Peak || Spacewatch || EOS || align=right | 2.0 km || 
|-id=944 bgcolor=#d6d6d6
| 484944 ||  || — || September 24, 2009 || Mount Lemmon || Mount Lemmon Survey || — || align=right | 3.0 km || 
|-id=945 bgcolor=#d6d6d6
| 484945 ||  || — || August 17, 2009 || Catalina || CSS || — || align=right | 2.1 km || 
|-id=946 bgcolor=#fefefe
| 484946 ||  || — || September 22, 2009 || Kitt Peak || Spacewatch || critical || align=right data-sort-value="0.52" | 520 m || 
|-id=947 bgcolor=#d6d6d6
| 484947 ||  || — || September 16, 2009 || Kitt Peak || Spacewatch || — || align=right | 3.8 km || 
|-id=948 bgcolor=#d6d6d6
| 484948 ||  || — || September 25, 2009 || Kitt Peak || Spacewatch || — || align=right | 2.2 km || 
|-id=949 bgcolor=#d6d6d6
| 484949 ||  || — || September 17, 2004 || Kitt Peak || Spacewatch || — || align=right | 2.7 km || 
|-id=950 bgcolor=#fefefe
| 484950 ||  || — || September 25, 2009 || Catalina || CSS || — || align=right data-sort-value="0.82" | 820 m || 
|-id=951 bgcolor=#d6d6d6
| 484951 ||  || — || September 15, 2009 || Kitt Peak || Spacewatch || — || align=right | 2.4 km || 
|-id=952 bgcolor=#d6d6d6
| 484952 ||  || — || September 28, 2009 || Mount Lemmon || Mount Lemmon Survey || EOS || align=right | 1.9 km || 
|-id=953 bgcolor=#d6d6d6
| 484953 ||  || — || September 16, 2009 || Mount Lemmon || Mount Lemmon Survey || EOS || align=right | 1.3 km || 
|-id=954 bgcolor=#d6d6d6
| 484954 ||  || — || September 21, 2009 || Mount Lemmon || Mount Lemmon Survey || — || align=right | 2.4 km || 
|-id=955 bgcolor=#d6d6d6
| 484955 ||  || — || September 25, 2009 || La Sagra || OAM Obs. || — || align=right | 3.7 km || 
|-id=956 bgcolor=#d6d6d6
| 484956 ||  || — || September 20, 2009 || Kitt Peak || Spacewatch || — || align=right | 2.4 km || 
|-id=957 bgcolor=#d6d6d6
| 484957 ||  || — || September 16, 2009 || Kitt Peak || Spacewatch || — || align=right | 2.3 km || 
|-id=958 bgcolor=#d6d6d6
| 484958 ||  || — || September 18, 2009 || Kitt Peak || Spacewatch || — || align=right | 3.3 km || 
|-id=959 bgcolor=#d6d6d6
| 484959 ||  || — || September 16, 2009 || Catalina || CSS || — || align=right | 4.7 km || 
|-id=960 bgcolor=#fefefe
| 484960 ||  || — || October 12, 2009 || La Sagra || OAM Obs. || — || align=right | 1.3 km || 
|-id=961 bgcolor=#d6d6d6
| 484961 ||  || — || October 12, 2009 || La Sagra || OAM Obs. || — || align=right | 2.9 km || 
|-id=962 bgcolor=#d6d6d6
| 484962 ||  || — || October 13, 2009 || La Sagra || OAM Obs. || EOS || align=right | 3.0 km || 
|-id=963 bgcolor=#fefefe
| 484963 ||  || — || October 14, 2009 || Mayhill || A. Lowe || — || align=right data-sort-value="0.99" | 990 m || 
|-id=964 bgcolor=#fefefe
| 484964 ||  || — || September 23, 2009 || Kitt Peak || Spacewatch || — || align=right data-sort-value="0.71" | 710 m || 
|-id=965 bgcolor=#fefefe
| 484965 ||  || — || October 15, 2009 || La Sagra || OAM Obs. || — || align=right data-sort-value="0.65" | 650 m || 
|-id=966 bgcolor=#d6d6d6
| 484966 ||  || — || August 17, 2009 || Kitt Peak || Spacewatch || — || align=right | 2.5 km || 
|-id=967 bgcolor=#fefefe
| 484967 ||  || — || October 11, 2009 || La Sagra || OAM Obs. || — || align=right data-sort-value="0.71" | 710 m || 
|-id=968 bgcolor=#d6d6d6
| 484968 ||  || — || September 22, 2009 || Kitt Peak || Spacewatch || — || align=right | 2.3 km || 
|-id=969 bgcolor=#d6d6d6
| 484969 ||  || — || September 16, 2009 || Catalina || CSS || — || align=right | 3.7 km || 
|-id=970 bgcolor=#d6d6d6
| 484970 ||  || — || October 12, 2009 || La Sagra || OAM Obs. || TIR || align=right | 3.7 km || 
|-id=971 bgcolor=#fefefe
| 484971 ||  || — || September 16, 2009 || Kitt Peak || Spacewatch || — || align=right data-sort-value="0.62" | 620 m || 
|-id=972 bgcolor=#d6d6d6
| 484972 ||  || — || September 25, 2009 || Catalina || CSS || — || align=right | 3.2 km || 
|-id=973 bgcolor=#d6d6d6
| 484973 ||  || — || October 15, 2009 || La Sagra || OAM Obs. || — || align=right | 4.7 km || 
|-id=974 bgcolor=#fefefe
| 484974 ||  || — || October 15, 2009 || Siding Spring || SSS || — || align=right | 1.2 km || 
|-id=975 bgcolor=#d6d6d6
| 484975 ||  || — || March 26, 2007 || Mount Lemmon || Mount Lemmon Survey || — || align=right | 3.7 km || 
|-id=976 bgcolor=#FFC2E0
| 484976 ||  || — || October 19, 2009 || Siding Spring || SSS || APOPHAcritical || align=right data-sort-value="0.71" | 710 m || 
|-id=977 bgcolor=#d6d6d6
| 484977 ||  || — || September 28, 2009 || Mount Lemmon || Mount Lemmon Survey || — || align=right | 3.1 km || 
|-id=978 bgcolor=#d6d6d6
| 484978 ||  || — || September 26, 2009 || Catalina || CSS || — || align=right | 5.2 km || 
|-id=979 bgcolor=#d6d6d6
| 484979 ||  || — || September 29, 2009 || Mount Lemmon || Mount Lemmon Survey || EOS || align=right | 2.1 km || 
|-id=980 bgcolor=#d6d6d6
| 484980 ||  || — || October 18, 2009 || Mount Lemmon || Mount Lemmon Survey || — || align=right | 3.8 km || 
|-id=981 bgcolor=#fefefe
| 484981 ||  || — || December 13, 2006 || Kitt Peak || Spacewatch || critical || align=right data-sort-value="0.57" | 570 m || 
|-id=982 bgcolor=#fefefe
| 484982 ||  || — || October 23, 2009 || Mount Lemmon || Mount Lemmon Survey || — || align=right data-sort-value="0.68" | 680 m || 
|-id=983 bgcolor=#d6d6d6
| 484983 ||  || — || September 28, 2009 || Mount Lemmon || Mount Lemmon Survey || — || align=right | 3.5 km || 
|-id=984 bgcolor=#d6d6d6
| 484984 ||  || — || September 29, 2009 || Kitt Peak || Spacewatch || — || align=right | 2.6 km || 
|-id=985 bgcolor=#d6d6d6
| 484985 ||  || — || October 21, 2009 || Mount Lemmon || Mount Lemmon Survey || — || align=right | 2.6 km || 
|-id=986 bgcolor=#d6d6d6
| 484986 ||  || — || October 21, 2009 || Catalina || CSS || — || align=right | 3.6 km || 
|-id=987 bgcolor=#d6d6d6
| 484987 ||  || — || September 30, 2009 || Mount Lemmon || Mount Lemmon Survey || EOS || align=right | 2.3 km || 
|-id=988 bgcolor=#d6d6d6
| 484988 ||  || — || October 23, 2009 || Mount Lemmon || Mount Lemmon Survey || — || align=right | 3.7 km || 
|-id=989 bgcolor=#fefefe
| 484989 ||  || — || October 14, 2009 || Kitt Peak || Spacewatch || — || align=right data-sort-value="0.61" | 610 m || 
|-id=990 bgcolor=#d6d6d6
| 484990 ||  || — || October 26, 2009 || Kitt Peak || Spacewatch || — || align=right | 2.5 km || 
|-id=991 bgcolor=#d6d6d6
| 484991 ||  || — || October 18, 2009 || La Sagra || OAM Obs. || — || align=right | 5.1 km || 
|-id=992 bgcolor=#d6d6d6
| 484992 ||  || — || October 24, 2009 || Kitt Peak || Spacewatch || VER || align=right | 2.3 km || 
|-id=993 bgcolor=#d6d6d6
| 484993 ||  || — || October 24, 2009 || Kitt Peak || Spacewatch || — || align=right | 3.1 km || 
|-id=994 bgcolor=#d6d6d6
| 484994 ||  || — || October 15, 2009 || La Sagra || OAM Obs. || (8737) || align=right | 4.6 km || 
|-id=995 bgcolor=#fefefe
| 484995 ||  || — || November 8, 2009 || Mount Lemmon || Mount Lemmon Survey || — || align=right data-sort-value="0.57" | 570 m || 
|-id=996 bgcolor=#d6d6d6
| 484996 ||  || — || September 22, 2009 || Mount Lemmon || Mount Lemmon Survey || — || align=right | 3.7 km || 
|-id=997 bgcolor=#fefefe
| 484997 ||  || — || November 9, 2009 || Kitt Peak || Spacewatch || — || align=right data-sort-value="0.52" | 520 m || 
|-id=998 bgcolor=#d6d6d6
| 484998 ||  || — || September 21, 2009 || Mount Lemmon || Mount Lemmon Survey || — || align=right | 2.7 km || 
|-id=999 bgcolor=#d6d6d6
| 484999 ||  || — || October 26, 2009 || Kitt Peak || Spacewatch || — || align=right | 3.1 km || 
|-id=000 bgcolor=#d6d6d6
| 485000 ||  || — || November 10, 2009 || Mount Lemmon || Mount Lemmon Survey || — || align=right | 3.4 km || 
|}

References

External links 
 Discovery Circumstances: Numbered Minor Planets (480001)–(485000) (IAU Minor Planet Center)

0484